= Outline of Metro Manila =

Overview of and topical guide to Metro Manila

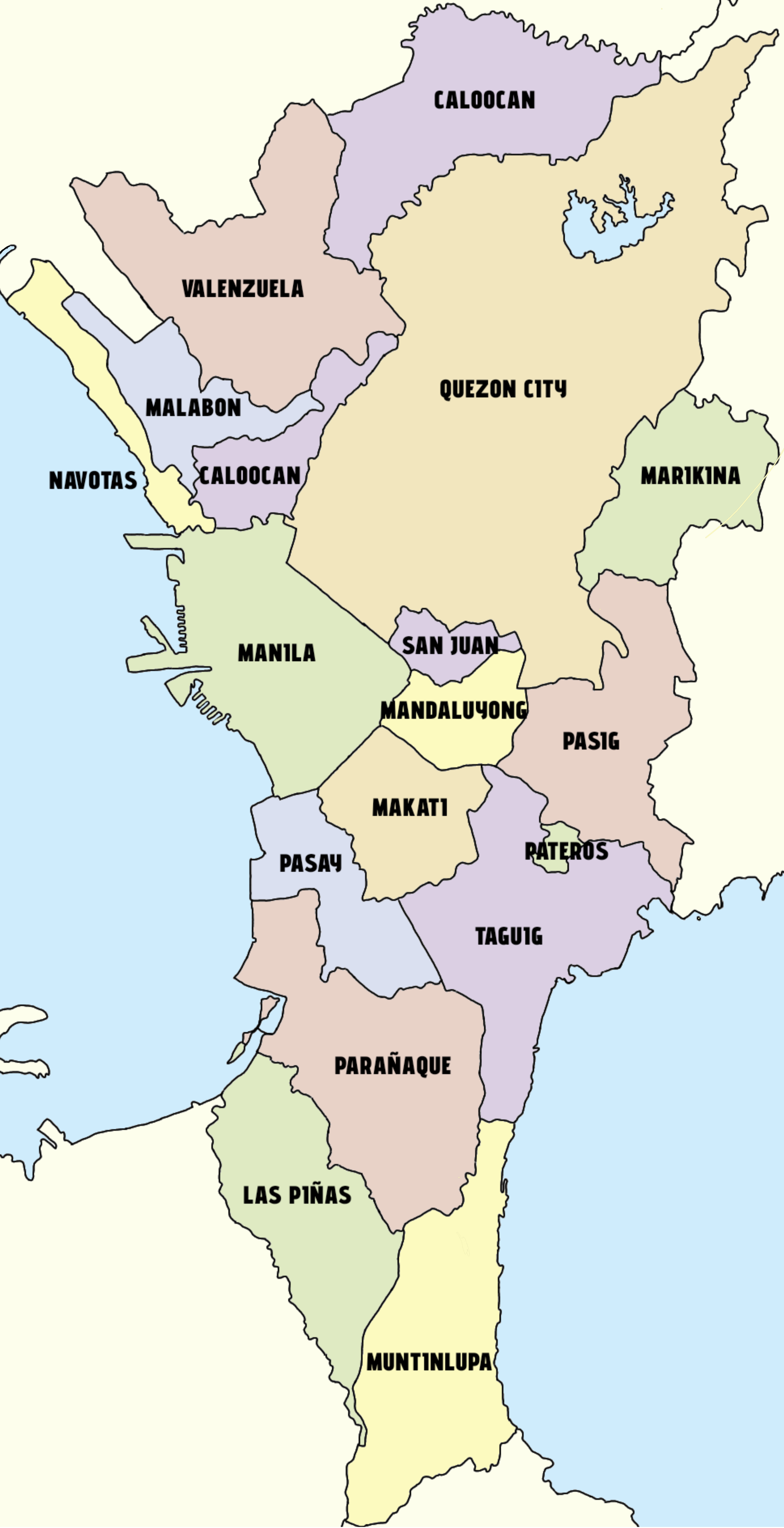
Map of Metro Manila with NAMRIA-drawn boundaries.

The following outline is provided as an overview of and topical guide to Metro Manila:

Metro Manila is the capital region of the Philippines, and is one of its seventeen administrative regions. It is located on the eastern shore of Manila Bay, in the southern portion of the island of Luzon. It lies between the Central Luzon and Calabarzon regions, with the province of Bulacan to the north, Rizal to the east, and Laguna and Cavite to the south.

Metro Manila comprises 16 cities and municipalities, including the capital city, Manila. Although Metro Manila was formed only in 1975, Manila itself dates back to 1571, with the establishment of the Province of Manila during the Spanish colonial period. The earliest evidence of human life in and around the area of Manila was dated to around 3000 BC.

With a population of 14,001,751 in 2024, Metro Manila is the largest metropolitan area in the Philippines, and the tenth most populous metropolitan area in Asia. Its total area is 636.00 square kilometres (245.56 mi^{2}), smaller than Philippine cities Davao City, Puerto Princesa, Zamboanga City and Butuan, and Southeast Asian city propers Bangkok, Jakarta, Hanoi and Taipei.

== General reference ==
- Pronunciation: /məˈnɪlə/
- Common English name(s): Metro Manila, Manila (informal)
- Local name(s): Kalakhang Maynila, Maynila, Kamaynilaan
- Official English name: National Capital Region of the Republic of the Philippines
- Official local name: Pambansang Punong Rehiyon ng Republika ng Pilipinas
- Nickname(s): See: Nicknames of Manila
- Adjectival(s): Manilan, Manileño
- Demonym(s): Manileños, Manileñas, Manilans
- Abbreviation(s) and code(s):
  - Common abbreviations: NCR, M.M., MNL
  - Vehicle registration code: NCR (2014 series)
  - ISO 3166-2 code: PH–00
  - ZIP code: 1000–1800
  - IDD : area code : 2

== Geography ==
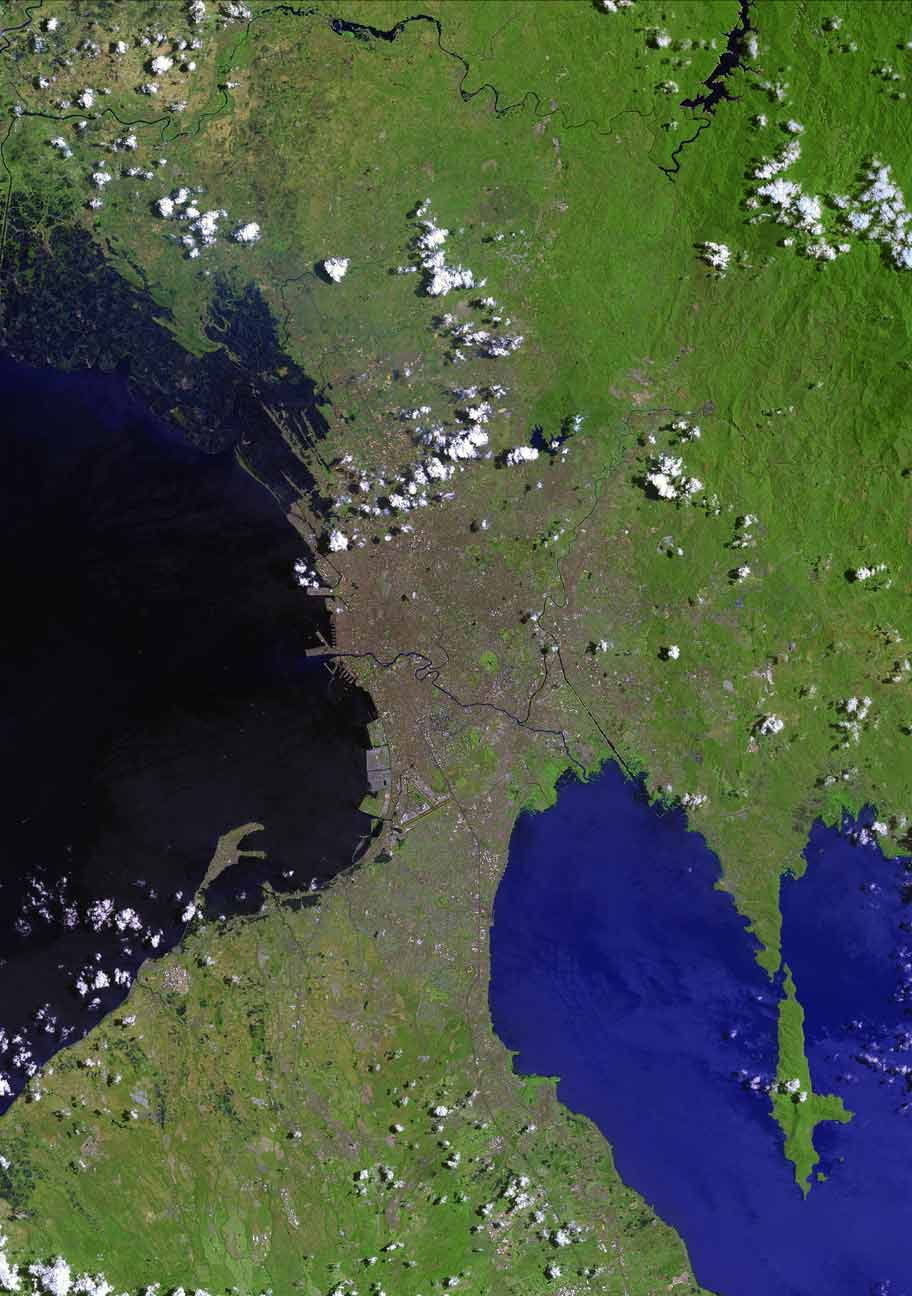
Satellite view of Metro Manila

- Metro Manila is a:
  - capital region
  - metropolitan area
  - administrative region of the Philippines.
  - isthmus in southern Luzon between Manila Bay, an arm of the South China Sea, and Laguna de Bay.

=== Location ===
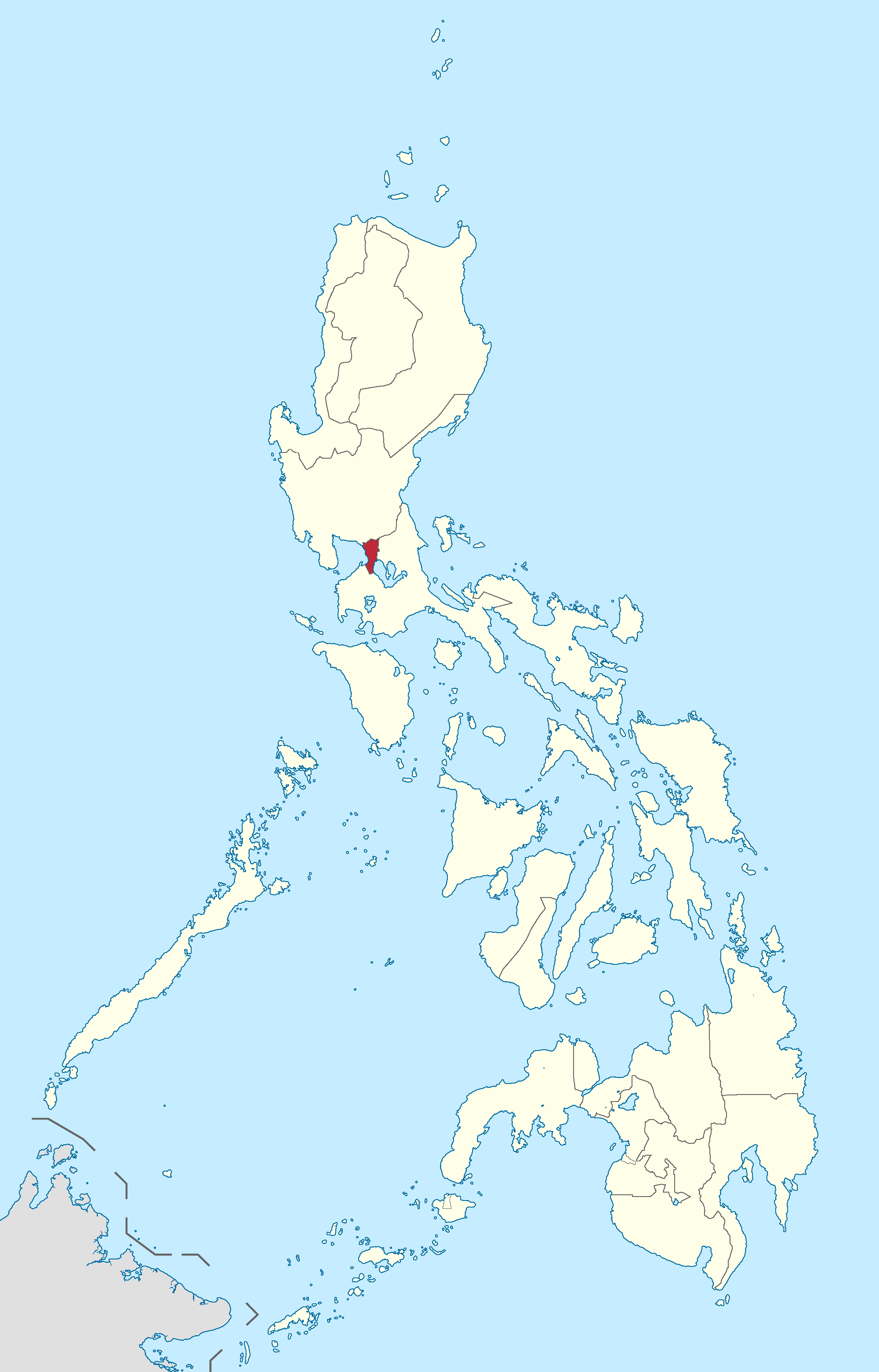
Location of Metro Manila in the Philippines

- Metro Manila is situated in the following regions.
  - Northern Hemisphere, Eastern Hemisphere
    - Asia
      - Southeast Asia
        - Maritime Southeast Asia
          - Philippines
            - Luzon
              - Greater Manila Area
  - Time zone: Philippine Standard Time (UTC+08)
- Population of Metro Manila: 12,877,253 (2015 Census)
- Area of Metro Manila: 613.5 km^{2}
- Atlas of Metro Manila
- Climate of Metro Manila: tropical savanna and tropical monsoon

=== Geographic features ===
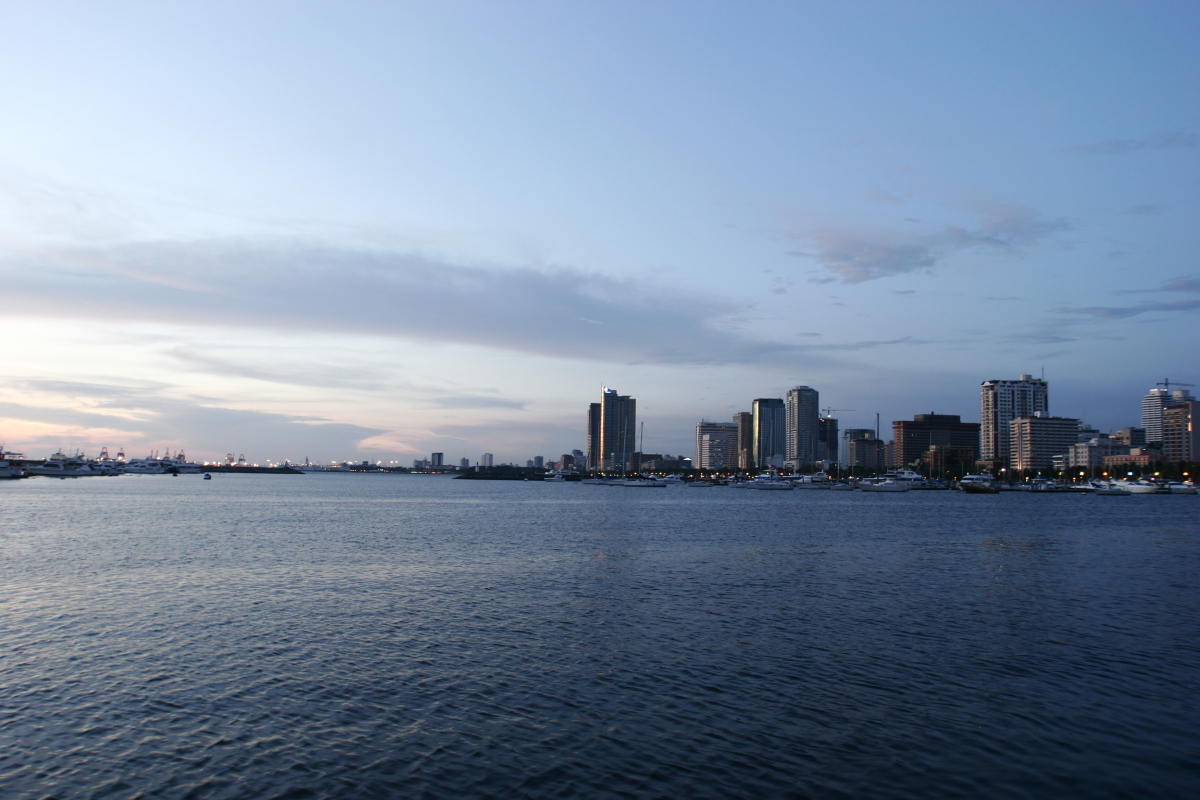
Manila city skyline over Manila Bay

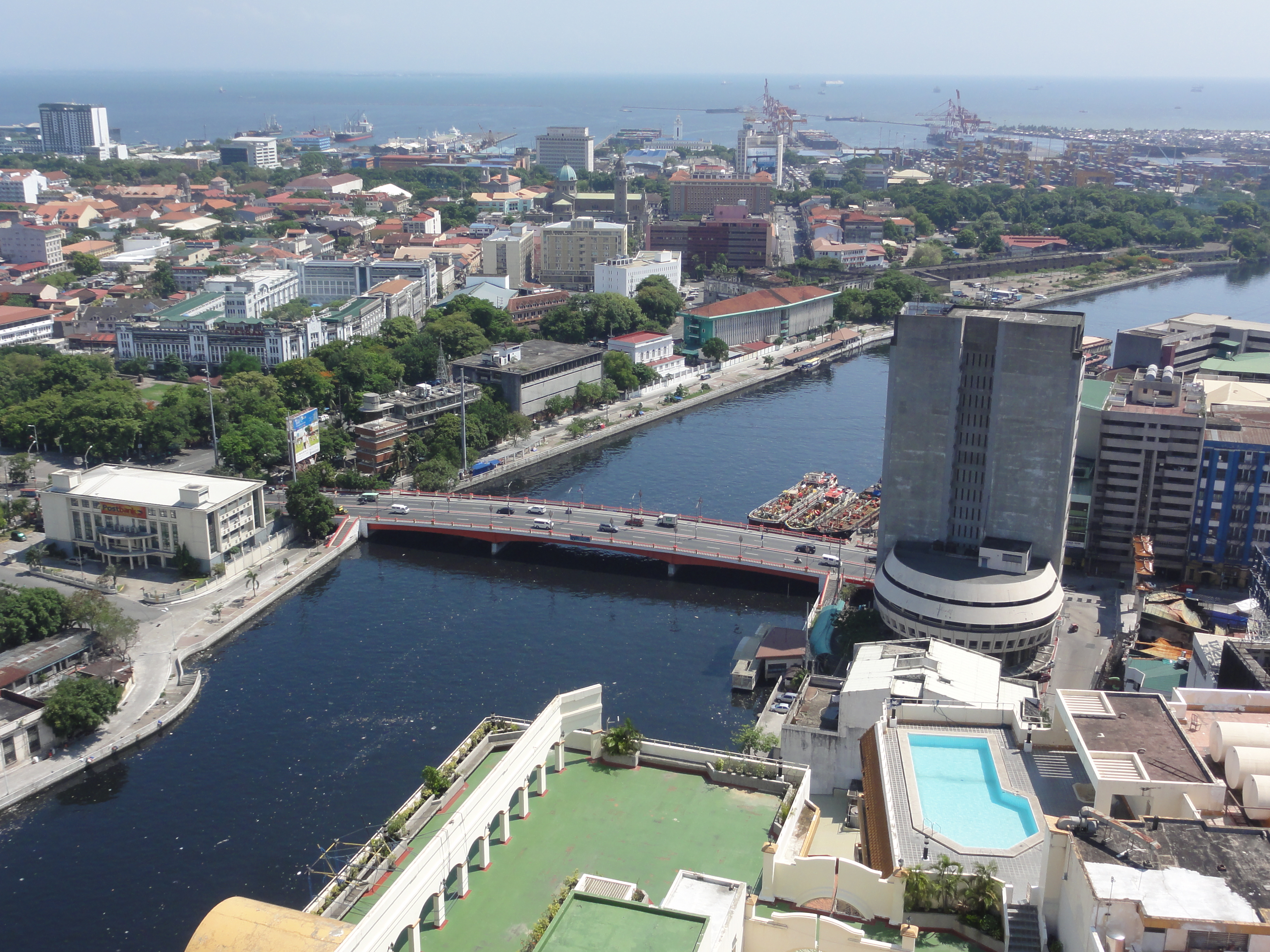
The Pasig River bisects the region in the middle

- Manila Bay
- Pasig River (Rivers of Metro Manila)
- Marikina River
- Laguna de Bay
- Sierra Madre
- Islands in the Greater Manila Area
- Marikina Valley Fault System
- Beaches in the Greater Manila Area

=== Places ===
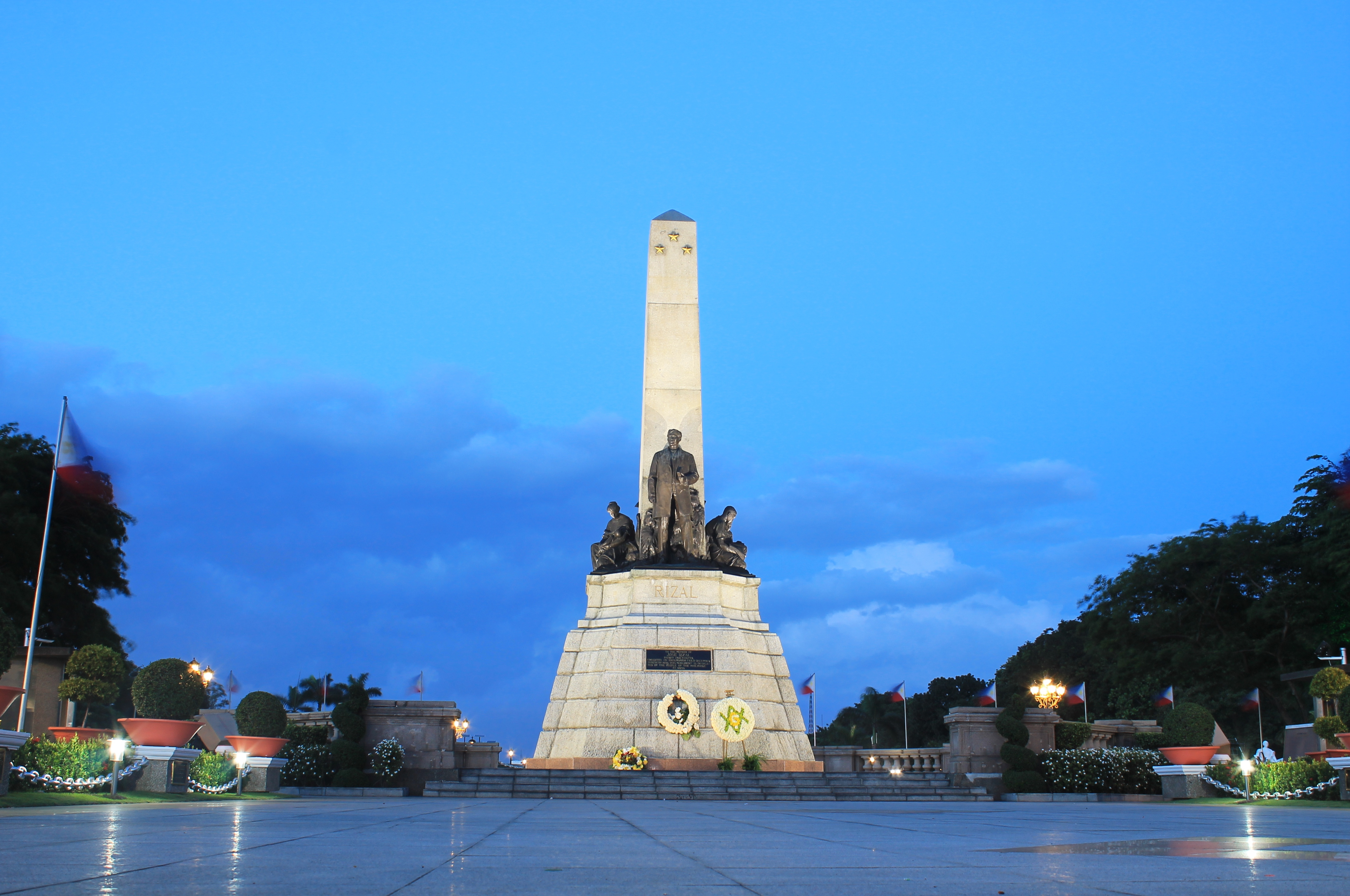
Rizal Monument located at the center of Rizal Park

An aerial view of Quezon Memorial Circle

- Parks in Metro Manila
  - National parks
    - Rizal Park
    - Quezon Memorial Circle
  - Nature reserves
    - La Mesa Watershed Reservation
  - Nature parks
    - Arroceros Forest Park
    - Balara Filters Park
    - Freedom Island
    - University of the Philippines Arboretum
  - Squares and plazas
    - Plaza de Armas (Manila)
    - Liwasang Bonifacio (Plaza Bonifacio)
    - Plaza Dilao
    - Plaza de España (Manila)
    - Plaza de Mexico (Manila)
    - Plaza Miranda
    - Plaza Moraga
    - Plaza Moriones
    - Plaza Rajah Sulayman
    - Plaza de Roma
    - Plaza San Lorenzo Ruiz
  - Zoos and aquaria
    - Ark Avilon Zoo
    - Manila Ocean Park
    - Manila Zoo
    - Ninoy Aquino Parks & Wildlife Center
    - Pasig Rainforest Park
- Heritage sites
  - World Heritage Sites in Metro Manila
    - San Agustin Church (Baroque Churches of the Philippines)
  - Cultural Properties of the Philippines in Metro Manila
  - Historical markers in Metro Manila

=== Administrative divisions ===
Administrative divisions of Metro Manila

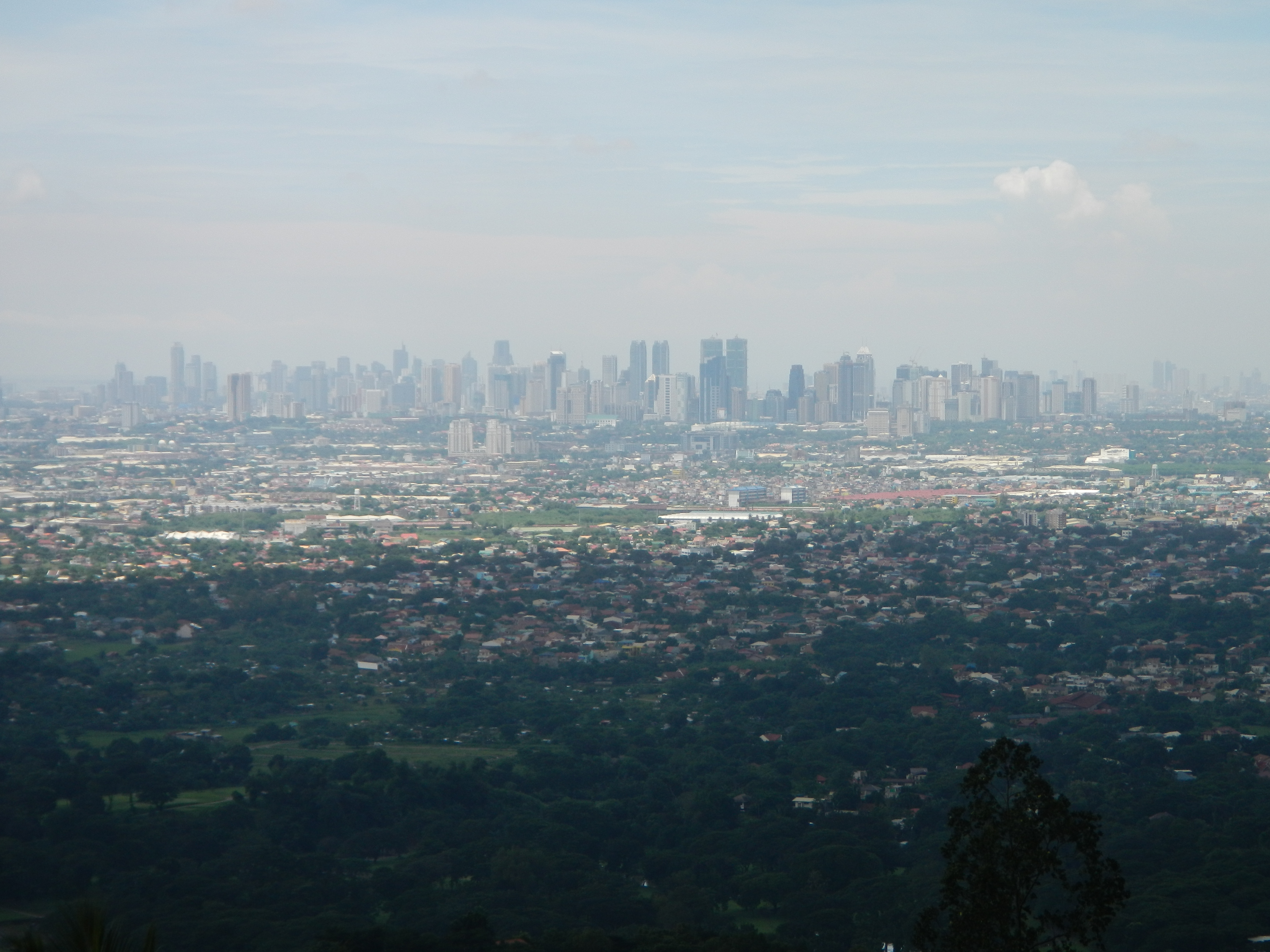
Metro Manila as seen from the Sierra Madre mountains east of the region in Rizal

- Cities of Metro Manila
  - Manila
  - Caloocan
  - Las Piñas
  - Makati
  - Malabon
  - Mandaluyong
  - Marikina
  - Muntinlupa
  - Navotas
  - Parañaque
  - Pasay
  - Pasig
  - Quezon City
  - San Juan
  - Taguig
  - Valenzuela
- Municipality of Metro Manila
  - Pateros
- Barangays of Metro Manila
  - Districts of Manila
    - Binondo, Ermita, Intramuros, Malate, Paco, Pandacan, Port Area, Quiapo, San Andres, San Miguel, San Nicolas, Santa Ana, Santa Cruz, Santa Mesa, Tondo

== Economy and infrastructure ==
- Philippine Stock Exchange
- Manila Commodity Exchange
- Makati Business Club
- Central business districts
  - Makati Central Business District
  - Ortigas Center
  - Bonifacio Global City
- Mixed-use developments
  - Araneta Center
  - Arca South
  - Arcovia City
  - Ayala Center
  - Bay City, Metro Manila
  - Bridgetowne
  - Capitol Commons
  - Century City, Makati
  - Circuit Makati
  - Eastwood City
  - Entertainment City
  - Eton Centris
  - New Manila Bay–City of Pearl
  - Newport City, Metro Manila
  - Riverbanks Center
  - Robinsons Cybergate
  - Rockwell Center
  - San Lazaro Tourism and Business Park
  - Triangle Park
  - U.P.-Ayala Land TechnoHub
- Skyscrapers (Tallest buildings in Metro Manila)
- Land reclamation in Metro Manila
- Poverty
  - Slums in Metro Manila
    - Bagong Silangan
    - Payatas
    - San Andres
    - Smokey Mountain
    - Tondo

=== Communication ===
- Newspapers published in Metro Manila
- Television stations in Metro Manila
- Radio stations in Metro Manila

=== Tourism ===
Tourism in Metro Manila

- Hotels in Metro Manila
- Casinos
  - City of Dreams Manila
  - Okada Manila
  - Resorts World Manila
  - Solaire Resort & Casino
- Gambling in Metro Manila
- Theme parks
  - KidZania Manila
  - Star City (amusement park)

=== Transportation ===
- Road
  - Roads in Metro Manila
  - Bridges and crossings of the Pasig River
  - Bridges and crossings of the Marikina River
  - Unified Vehicular Volume Reduction Program
- Rail
  - Light Rail Transit Authority
  - Metro Rail Transit Corporation
  - Philippine National Railways
  - Manila Light Rail Transit System
    - Line 1
    - Line 2
    - Line 4
    - Line 6
  - Manila Metro Rail Transit System
    - Line 3
    - Line 5
    - Line 7
    - Line 8
    - Line 9
  - PNR Metro Commuter Line
  - Strong Republic Transit System
  - Rail transit stations in the Greater Manila Area
  - Bicutan Automated Guideway Transit System
  - University of the Philippines Diliman Automated Guideway Transit System
- Aviation
  - Manila International Airport Authority
  - Clark International Airport Corporation
  - Airports in the Greater Manila Area
    - Ninoy Aquino International Airport
    - Clark International Airport
    - Subic Bay International Airport
- Water
  - Port of Manila
    - North Port Passenger Terminal
  - Pasig River Ferry Service

== Education ==
- Universities and colleges in Metro Manila
- Primary and secondary schools in Metro Manila
- International schools in Metro Manila
- Libraries in Metro Manila
- University Belt
- Military schools
  - Armed Forces of the Philippines Command and General Staff College
  - National Defense College of the Philippines
- Seminaries and theological colleges
  - Alliance Graduate School
  - Asian Seminary of Christian Ministries
  - Christ the King Mission Seminary
  - Maryhill School of Theology
  - San Carlos Seminary
  - South East Asia Graduate School of Theology

== Government and politics ==
- Metropolitan Manila Development Authority
  - Chairman: Romando S. Artes
  - Metro Manila Council
    - Mayors of Metro Manila
- Legislative districts
  - Caloocan 1st, 2nd and 3rd districts
  - Las Piñas district
  - Makati 1st and 2nd districts
  - Malabon district
  - Mandaluyong district
  - Manila 1st, 2nd, 3rd, 4th, 5th and 6th districts
  - Marikina 1st and 2nd districts
  - Muntinlupa district
  - Navotas district
  - Parañaque 1st and 2nd districts
  - Pasay district
  - Pasig district
  - Pateros-Taguig district
  - Quezon City 1st, 2nd, 3rd, 4th, 5th and 6th districts
  - San Juan district
  - Taguig district
  - Valenzuela 1st and 2nd districts
- Public services
  - National Capital Region Police Office
    - Eastern Police District
    - Manila Police District
    - Northern Police District
    - Quezon City Police District
    - Southern Police District
  - Bureau of Fire Protection National Capital Region
    - Manila Fire District
    - Fire District II
    - Fire District III
    - Fire District IV
    - Quezon City Fire District
  - Bureau of Jail Management and Penology Regional Office - National Capital Region
  - New Bilibid Prison
  - Pasig River Rehabilitation Commission
  - Laguna Lake Development Authority
- Military in Metro Manila
  - National Capital Regional Command (Philippines)
  - AFP Joint Task Force-National Capital Region
  - Camp Aguinaldo
  - Fort Bonifacio
  - Camp Crame
  - Camp Atienza
  - Villamor Air Base
- Utilities
  - Metropolitan Waterworks and Sewerage System
  - Manila Water
  - Maynilad Water Services
  - Water privatization in Metro Manila
  - Meralco
- Elections
  - 2019 Philippine House of Representatives elections
  - 2019 Philippine local elections
- International relations
  - List of sister cities in Metro Manila

== Health ==
- Hospitals in Metro Manila
  - Gota de Leche
  - Lung Center of the Philippines
  - National Center for Mental Health
  - National Kidney and Transplant Institute
  - Philippine General Hospital
  - Philippine Heart Center
  - Research Institute for Tropical Medicine
- Orphanages
  - Asilo de San Vicente de Paul
  - Hospicio de San Jose
  - White Cross Orphanage

== History ==
- Prehistory of Manila
- Pre-Spanish era
  - Kingdom of Tondo
  - Kingdom of Namayan
  - Kingdom of Maynila
  - Battle of Manila (1570)
- Spanish colonial period
  - Manila (province)
  - Real Audiencia of Manila
  - Manila galleon
  - Battle of Bangkusay Channel
  - Battle of Manila (1574)
  - Conspiracy of the Maharlikas
  - Sangley Rebellion
  - 1645 Luzon earthquake
  - Battles of La Naval de Manila
  - Battle of Manila (1762)
  - British occupation of Manila
  - Raid on Manila (1798)
  - 1880 Luzon earthquakes
  - Philippine Revolution
    - Cry of Pugad Lawin
    - Battle of Pasong Tamo
    - Battle of Manila (1896)
    - Battle of San Juan del Monte
    - Battle of San Mateo and Montalban
    - 1896 Manila mutiny
    - Battle of Pateros
    - Battle of Zapote Bridge (1897)
    - Retreat to Montalban
  - Spanish–American War
    - Battle of Manila Bay
    - Battle of Manila (1898)
- American colonial period
  - Province of Rizal
  - Manila Army and Navy Club
  - Fort William McKinley
  - Philippine–American War
    - Battle of Caloocan
    - Second Battle of Caloocan
    - Battle of Zapote River
    - Battle of Paye
  - Far Eastern Championship Games
  - Harbor Defenses of Manila and Subic Bays
  - World War II
    - Post of Manila
    - City of Greater Manila
    - Santo Tomas Internment Camp
    - Battle of Manila (1945)
    - Manila massacre
  - Treaty of Manila (1946)
- 1946–1986
  - Treaty of Manila (1954)
  - Manila Accord
  - Philippine Constabulary Metropolitan Command
  - 1968 Casiguran earthquake
  - Typhoon Patsy (1970)
  - Plaza Miranda bombing
  - Metropolitan Manila Commission
  - City of Man
  - Thrilla in Manila
  - Assassination of Benigno Aquino, Jr.
  - People Power Revolution
- 1986–Present
  - Mendiola massacre
  - Metropolitan Manila Authority
  - 1990 Luzon earthquake
  - World Youth Day 1995
  - Metropolitan Manila Development Authority
  - Ozone Disco Club fire
  - Pasig River Rehabilitation Commission
  - Rizal Day bombings
  - Second EDSA Revolution
  - May 1 riots
  - Oakwood mutiny
  - Manila Peninsula siege
  - PhilSports Stadium stampede
  - 2007 Glorietta explosion
  - Batasang Pambansa bombing
  - Typhoon Ketsana
  - Manila hostage crisis
  - 2010 Philippine Bar exam bombing
  - 2012 Metro Manila flooding
  - Million People March
  - Pope Francis's visit to the Philippines
  - Resorts World Manila attack
  - 2020 Taal Volcano eruption
  - COVID-19 pandemic in Metro Manila
  - Typhoon Vamco (Ulysses)

== Culture ==
- Cultural Center of the Philippines Complex
- Annual events in Metro Manila
  - Sporting events in Metro Manila
- Cultural Properties of the Philippines in Metro Manila
- Museums in Metro Manila
- Public art in Metro Manila
- Songs about Manila
- Shopping malls in Metro Manila
- Sports venues in Metro Manila
- Theaters and concert halls in Metro Manila
  - Art Deco theaters in Metro Manila

== Religion ==
- Religious buildings in Metro Manila
  - Buddhist temples
    - IBPS Manila
    - Ocean Sky Chan Monastery
    - Seng Guan Temple
  - Churches
    - Roman Catholic churches in Metro Manila
  - Mosques
    - Masjid Al-Dahab
    - Baclaran Mosque
- Roman Catholic Church
  - Roman Catholic Archdiocese of Manila
    - Roman Catholic Diocese of Antipolo
    - Roman Catholic Diocese of Cubao
    - Roman Catholic Diocese of Imus
    - Roman Catholic Diocese of Kalookan
    - Roman Catholic Diocese of Malolos
    - Roman Catholic Diocese of Novaliches
    - Roman Catholic Diocese of Parañaque
    - Roman Catholic Diocese of Pasig
    - Roman Catholic Diocese of San Pablo
  - Military Ordinariate of the Philippines
- Cemeteries in Metro Manila

== See also ==
- Index of Metro Manila–related articles
- Outline of the Philippines
