= List of public art in Metro Manila =

Public art in a Philippine region

This is a list of public art in Metro Manila, organized by city and municipality. This list applies only to works of public art accessible in an outdoor public space. For example, this does not include artwork visible inside a museum, or installed in any other indoor public space.

Note that Philippine copyright law does not provide freedom of panorama for copyrighted public art, and therefore several images may be missing from this list.

== Manila ==
Image	Title / Individual Commemorated	Location and Coordinates	Date	Sculptor/ Designer	Type	Source and Notes
	Adolfo López Mateos	Plaza Mexico, Intramuros, 14.59891°N 120.98090°E		Luis Antonio Sanguino		
	Alexander Pushkin	Mehan Garden, Ermita, 14.591932°N 120.980851°E	2010	Grigory Potosky		
	Andres Bonifacio	Ermita, 14.3527°N 120.5851°E	1998	Eduardo Castrillo		
	Andrés de Urdaneta, Miguel López de Legazpi	Intramuros, 14.58389°N 120.97549°E	1893	Agustí Querol Subirats	Statue	
	Arch of the Centuries	Plaza Intramuros, Sampaloc, 14.60841°N 120.99084°E	1611		Decorative arch	
	Arsenio Lacson	Plaza Lacson, Santa Cruz, 14.59891°N 120.98090°E	2003	Eduardo Castrillo		
	Benigno Aquino Jr.	Rizal Park, Ermita, 14.58389°N 120.97549°E	2010	Florante B. Caedo		
	Cayetano Arellano	Supreme Court Building, Ermita, 14.58001°N 120.98572°E	2003	Julie Lluch		
	Chino Roces	Mendiola Street, San Miguel, 14.59996°N 120.99142°E		Florante B. Caedo		
	Confucius	Rizal Park, Ermita, 14.583069°N 120.977689°E	2009			
	Corazon Aquino	Rizal Park, Ermita, 14.58389°N 120.97549°E	2010	Abdulmari "Toym" Imao, Jr.		
	Dom Justo Takayama	Plaza Dilao, Paco, 14.58545°N 120.99385°E		Johannes Masaaki Nishimori		
	Elpidio Quirino	Malate, 14.3350°N 120.597°E	1994	Abdulmari A. Imao, Sr.		
	Felipe Calderón	Plaza Felipe Calderón, Santa Ana, 14.58151°N 121.01217°E	1954			
	Francisco Carriedo Fountain	Plaza Santa Cruz, Santa Cruz, 14.59916°N 120.98013°E	1882		Fountain	
	Gomburza National Monument	Fort Santiago, Intramuros, 14.58239°N 120.97737°E	1972	Solomon Saprid		Restored in 2018.
	Jaime Sin	Rizal Park, Ermita, 14.58368°N 120.97598°E	2012	Shin Yanmin		
	José Abad Santos	Supreme Court Building, Ermita, 14.58001°N 120.98572°E	2003	Julie Lluch		
	José P. Laurel	Ermita, 14.57339°N 120.98101°E				
	José Martí	Intramuros, 14.581669°N 120.976694°E	2001	Alberto Lescay		
	José Rizal	Rizal Park, Ermita, 14.58345°N 120.97576°E	1913	Richard Kissling	Monument	
	José Sandino y Miranda	Plaza Miranda, Quiapo, 14.59824°N 120.98360°E	2002			
	King Carlos IV	Plaza de Roma, Intramuros, 14.59219°N 120.97302°E	1808–1824		Statue	Cast in 1808, installed in 1824.
	King Felipe II	Plaza España, Intramuros, 14.59355°N 120.97450°E	1998			
	Statue of the Sentinel of Freedom	Rizal Park, Ermita, 14.58422°N 120.98142°E	2004	Juan Sajid Imao		
	Manuel Roxas	Malate, 14.3424°N 120.5852°E	2005			
	Memorare - Manila 1945; World War II Battle of Manila	Plaza de Santa Isabel, Intramuros, 14.59041°N 120.97441°E	1995	Peter Guzman		
	Mexico-Philippines Friendship Monument	Plaza Mexico, Intramuros, 14.59443°N 120.97459°E	1966			
	Miguel de Benavides	University of Santo Tomas, Sampaloc, 14.60910°N 120.99032°E	1891	Tony Noel	Statue	
	Muhammad Kudarat	Rizal Park, Ermita, 14.58051°N 120.97810°E			Bust	
	Queen Isabel II	Puerta Isabel II, Intramuros 14.59412°N 120.97617°E	1860	Ponciano Ponzano	Statue	
	Rajah Sulayman	Plaza Rajah Sulayman, Malate 14.56877°N 120.98374°E	1976	Eduardo Castrillo		
	Ramon Magsaysay	Malate 14.57052°N 120.98244°E		Florante B. Caedo		NHI marker from 2007.
	Sigaw ng Tondo; Cry of Tondo	Plaza Moriones, Tondo 14.60936°N 120.96652°E	1978	Eduardo Castrillo		
	Simón de Anda	Anda Circle, Port Area 14.59080°N 120.97083°E	1871		Monument	

== Caloocan ==
Image	Title / Individual Commemorated	Location	Date	Sculptor/ Designer	Type	Notes
	Andres Bonifacio	Grace Park 14.65708°N 120.98397°E	1933	Guillermo Tolentino	Monument	

== Makati ==
Image	Title / Individual Commemorated	Location	Date	Sculptor/ Designer	Type	Notes
	Benigno Aquino Jr.	Ayala Avenue and Paseo de Roxas 14.55678°N 121.02151°E	1990s	Peter de Guzman		
	Pío del Pilar	Makati Avenue and Paseo de Roxas 14.55809°N 121.02591°E	1972	Jose M. Mendoza		
	Gabriela Silang	Ayala Avenue and Makati Avenue	1971	Jose M. Mendoza		
	Sultan Kudarat	Paseo de Roxas and Makati Avenue	1973	Jose M. Mendoza		

== Quezon City ==
Image	Title / Individual Commemorated	Location	Date	Sculptor/ Designer	Type	Notes
	Boy Scouts of the Philippines 11th World Scout Jamboree Memorial	South Triangle 14.634806°N 121.035361°E	1965	Florante Caedo		
	Maypagasa; Katipunan, Cry of Balintawak Monument	Cloverleaf 14.65685°N 120.99966°E	1974	Eugenio Bunuan	Statue	See also the 1911 monument relocated to U.Philippines in 1968
	Manuel Luis Quezon	Diliman 14.65074°N 121.04822°E	1978	Jose "Al" Giroy		
	Oblation	Diliman 14.65487°N 121.06486°E	1935	Guillermo Tolentino		
	People Power Revolution	White Plains 14.59997°N 121.05985°E	1993	Eduardo Castrillo		

== San Juan ==
Image	Title / Individual Commemorated	Location	Date	Sculptor/ Designer	Type	Notes
	Katipunan The Spirit of Pinaglabanan	Pinaglabanan Shrine 14.60477°N 121.03118°E	1974	Eduardo Castrillo	War memorial	
