= Rancho Arcilla =

Filipino artist

- Born: John Paul Escandor Arcilla; 1995 (age 30–31)
- Education: University of Santo Tomas
- Occupation: Artist
- Notable work: Intramuros Register of Styles (2021)

John Paul Escandor Arcilla, known as Rancho Arcilla, is a Filipino artist.

Arcilla authored the Intramuros Register of Styles (2021) and served as the first archivist of the Intramuros Administration from 2019 to 2024. The Intramuros Register of Styles is the main architectural code of Intramuros, the historic core of the City of Manila, Philippines. The Register became part of Presidential Decree No. 1616, as amended, when it was gazetted by the Official Gazette of the Philippines on June 17, 2022.

From 2021 to 2024, Arcilla was appointed as the Chairperson of the Intramuros Committee on Architectural Standards, a government technical panel first established under the Intramuros Administration in 1979 by President Ferdinand Marcos, Sr., to review development proposals in Intramuros, including new construction, and recommend their approval.

As an artist, Arcilla's works have been featured on commemorative stamps issued by the Philippine Postal Corporation and on legal tender issued by the Bangko Sentral ng Pilipinas. In 2013, he established The Nostalgic Thomasian project. He is also known for his art work SC Padre Faura Community (2026).
