= Bambi Harper =

Filipino historian (1940/1941–2023)

7th Administrator of Intramuros
- In office March 17, 2008 – July 8, 2010
- Preceded by: Dominador Ferrer
- Succeeded by: Jose Capistrano

Personal details
- Born: Anna Maria Lammoglia; January 10, 1941
- Died: August 4, 2023 (aged 82)
- Education: University of Santo Tomas

Anna Maria "Bambi'" Lammoglia de Harper (January 10, 1941 – August 4, 2023) was a Filipino cultural writer and socialite.

She was a founding member of the Concerned Citizens for the National Museum (now the Museum Foundation of the Philippines) as well as the Heritage Conservation Society. She wrote as also a columnist for the Philippine Daily Inquirer with her byline "Sense and Sensibility", which focused on Philippine cultural history. In 2008, she became 7th Administrator of the historic Intramuros district of Manila.

== Controversy ==
In early September 2008, it was reported that administrative charges could be leveled against Harper for having allowed the cutting down of 29 trees, including nine mahogany and flame trees at the Plaza de Roma fronting Manila Cathedral.

The Department of Environment and Natural Resources reported that Harper, as head of the Intramuros Administration, sought a permit in May 2008 to remove trees at the park so that the area could be landscaped and developed and to "replace [the trees] with historically appropriate trees which would not block the facade of Manila Cathedral."

Harper responded that she had not ordered the trees cut, but rather asked a contractor to move the trees to another part of the park. She said that a subordinate had mistakenly given approval for the trees to be cut.

== Writing ==
In 2012, she published Agueda: A Ballad of Stone and Wind.

== Death ==
Harper died on August 4, 2023, at the age of 82.

== Sources ==
- Ongpin, Ma. Isabel (March 28, 2008), "Ambient Voices: Bambi Harper", The Manila Times, archived from the original on May 11, 2008
- Jottings, Random (March 17, 2008), "Open Notebook: Challenge for heritage icon Bambi Harper", The Manila Times, archived from the original on November 22, 2008

Political offices
Preceded by Dominador Ferrer	Administrator of Intramuros; 2008–2010	Succeeded by Jose Capistrano
