= Baluarte de San Andres =

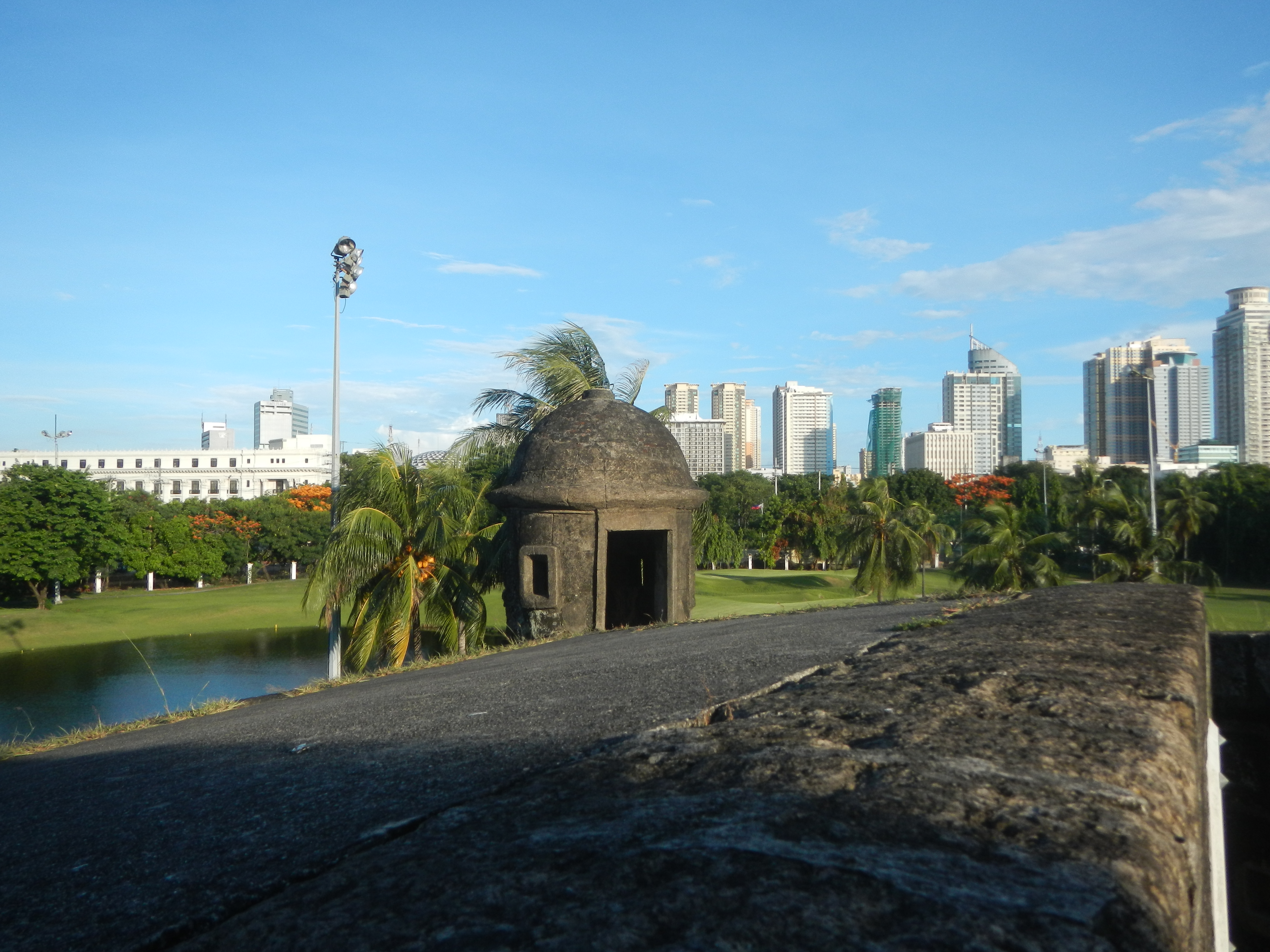
- Watchtower of the Baluarte de San Andres in Intramuros
- Interactive map of the Baluarte de San Andres area

General information
- Type: Fortification
- Architectural style: Bastioned fort
- Location: Muralla Street, Intramuros, Manila, Philippines
- Coordinates: 14°35′13″N 120°58′43″E
- Renovated: 1987
- Owner: Intramuros Administration

Technical details
- Structural system: Masonry

The Baluarte de San Andres is a bastion in Intramuros, which is a part of the Spanish colonial fortification in the historic Walled City. It was built in 1603 to protect the Puerto Real and the southeastern part of Intramuros. It was also known as the Baluarte de San Nicolas because it was located just in front of the Iglesia de San Nicolas de Tolentino, which is now the site of the present-day Manila Bulletin Building.
