= Guiller Asido =

Filipino politician

10th Administrator of Intramuros
- In office March 23, 2017 – June 30, 2022
- Preceded by: Marco Sardillo
- Succeeded by: Joan Padilla

Chief Operating Officer of the Tourism Infrastructure and Enterprise Zone Authority
- In office 2016–2017
- Preceded by: Mark Lapid
- Succeeded by: Pocholo Paragas

Personal details
- Education: University of Santo Tomas

Guiller Asido is the 10th administrator of the Intramuros Administration, an attached agency of the Department of Tourism mandated with the authority to restore and guide the development of Intramuros, Manila. He was previously the chief operating officer of the Tourism Infrastructure and Enterprise Zone Authority.

He earned the following degrees from the University of Santo Tomas in Manila: BA in literature, Bachelor of Laws, and Master of Laws (cum laude). He is also at present a professor of law at the Adamson University College of Law, Bulacan State University College of Law and San Beda College College of Arts and Sciences' Department of Legal Management, handling subjects such as commercial law review, banking and insurance law and special commercial laws.

Political offices
Preceded by Marco Sardillo	Administrator of Intramuros; 2017–Present	Incumbent
Preceded by Mark Lapid	Chief Operating Officer of the Tourism Infrastructure and Enterprise Zone Authority; 2016–2017	Succeeded by Pocholo Paragas
