= Book Stop Intramuros =

Pop-up library, Manila

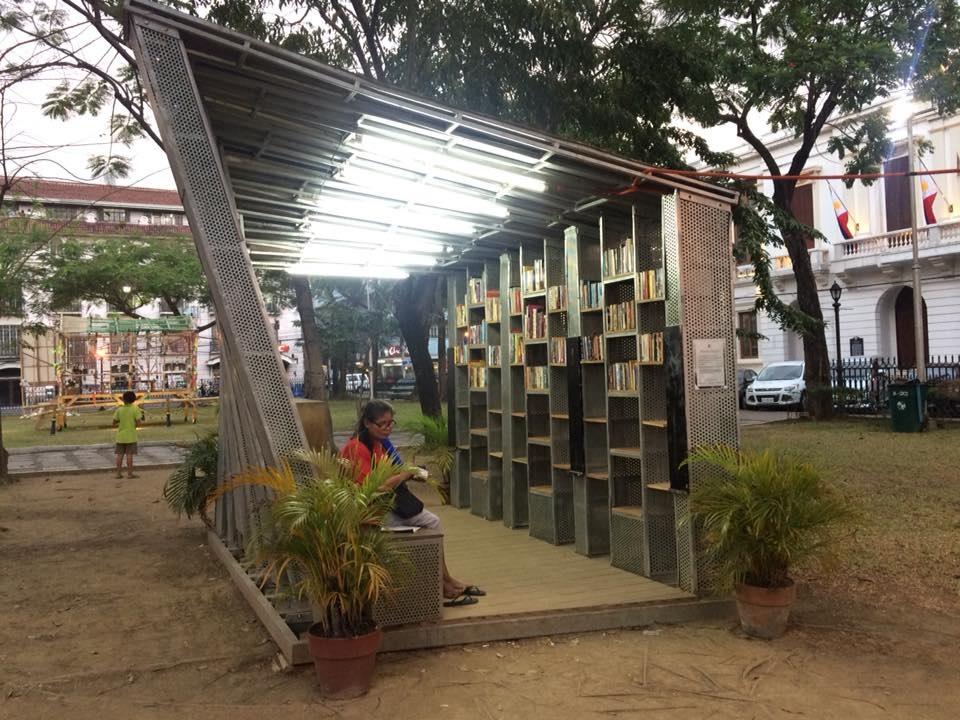
- Book Stop at Plaza Roma, Intramuros
- 14°35′32″N 120°58′23″E
- Location: Philippines
- Type: Outdoor pop-up library
- Scope: General Knowledge
- Established: 2016
- Architect(s): William Ti, WTA Architecture + Design Studio
- Service area: Intramuros, Manila
- Branch of: The Book Stop Project Network

Collection
- Size: 200-600
- Criteria for collection: General Knowledge

Other information
- Director: Lilia Diaz and Clark Hayudini (Coordinator)
- Parent organization: Intramuros Administration
- Affiliation: The Book Stop Project Network
- Website: intramuros.gov.ph

The Book Stop Intramuros is a pop-up library located in Plaza Roma, Intramuros, Manila. The unit was designed and conceptualized by William Ti and commissioned in 2016 by the WTA Architecture + Design Studio (WTA). In June 2017, the management and ownership of the Book Stop Intramuros was transferred to the Intramuros Administration.

The Book Stop Intramuros is a component of WTA's The Book Stop Project Network which explores how libraries need to evolve, attract and engage contemporary users, and promote reading for the younger generations.

== Awards ==
Some of the awards received by Book Stop Intramuros:

- Architizer People's and Jury's Choice Award, New York City, USA (2016);
- Shortlist for World Building of the Year, World Architecture Festival, Berlin, Germany (2016);
