= Jose Capistrano =

Filipino government official and CEO

3rd and 8th Administrator of Intramuros
- In office August 1, 1989 – April 19, 1990
- Preceded by: Eustacio Orobia
- Succeeded by: Edda Villaluna Henson
- In office August 27, 2010 – August 5, 2013
- Preceded by: Anna Maria Harper
- Succeeded by: Marco Sardillo

Personal details
- Education: Ateneo de Manila University

Jose "Junjun" Antiquisa Capistrano, Jr., was the former Administrator of the Intramuros Administration and the current President and CEO of Philippine Pharma Procurement Inc., a subsidiary of the Philippine International Trading Corporation under the Department of Trade and Industry. He succeeded Eustacio Orobia in 1986 as the 3rd Intramuros Administrator until 1990, and Bambi Harper in 2010 as the 8th Administrator until 2013.

== Career ==
Capistrano's career in government started with his appointment as Intramuros Administrator in 1989. From 1990 to 1992, he was the General Chairman and Vice-Chairman and from 1992 to 1998 the Director of the then Philippine Tourism Authority, now the Tourism Infrastructure and Enterprise Zone Authority. During his stint there, he helped privatize Fort Ilocandia. He was with the Department of Tourism for various years starting in 1995 up to his appointment again as Intramuros Administrator in 2010. During his second term as administrator from 2010 to 2013, the reconstruction of PHP 100 Million San Ignacio Church as the future Museo de Intramuros was started. A monument to Ho Chi Minh was also erected in Intramuros in 2011 under his stewardship.

Political offices
Preceded by Eustacio Orobia	Administrator of Intramuros; 1989–1990	Succeeded by Edda Villaluna Henson
Preceded by Anna Maria Harper	Administrator of Intramuros; 2010–2013	Succeeded by Marco Sardillo
