= Eustacio Orobia =

2nd Administrator of Intramuros
- In office November 14, 1986 – July 31, 1989
- Preceded by: Jaime C. Laya
- Succeeded by: Jose Capistrano

Eustacio B. Orobia, Jr. was the second Administrator of the Intramuros Administration, an attached agency of the Department of Tourism mandated with the authority to restore and guide the development of Intramuros, Manila. He was Administrator from 1986 to 1989, and was succeeded by Jose Capistrano. He was also the Chairman of the National Commission for Culture and the Arts from 1992 to 1996, a Member of the Board of Directors of the Nayong Pilipino Foundation from 1986 to 1986, and Head of the Presidential Task Force under the then Ministry of Human Settlements in 1986, among others.

Political offices
Preceded by Jaime C. Laya	Administrator of Intramuros; 1986–1989	Succeeded by Jose Capistrano
