= Edda Henson =

Edda Villaluna Henson

4th Administrator of Intramuros
- In office April 1990 – October 1995
- Preceded by: Jose Capistrano
- Succeeded by: Karlo Butiong

Edda Villaluna Henson is a socialite and member of the Villaluna family, called "the Mining Royal Family in the Philippines". In 1990, she was appointed the fourth Administrator of Intramuros by President Corazon Aquino, but was dismissed five years later on November 30, 1995 by President Fidel Ramos over corruption scandals, including anomalies in bidding for government projects.

Political offices
Preceded by Jose Capistrano	Administrator of Intramuros; 1990–1995	Succeeded by Karlo Butiong
