= William Ti =

Filipino architect

- Born: William Ti Jr. Tondo, Manila, Philippines
- Education: Bachelor’s degree in Architecture, University of Santo Tomas (2002); Master’s degree in Urban Design, National University of Singapore (2012)
- Occupation: Architect
- Years active: 2007–present
- Known for: Founder and Principal Architect of WTA Architecture and Design Studio; Creator of the Anthology Architecture and Design Festival
- Notable work: Ferdinand E. Marcos Stadium; Horizon Manila; Pasig River Esplanade; The Book Stop Project
- Awards: Archdaily Building of the Year - Sports; WAFX Overall Award; Ani ng Dangal Award
- Website: https://www.wtadesignstudio.com/

William Ti is a Filipino architect, urban planner, and advocate of social architecture. He is the founder and principal architect of WTA Architecture and Design Studio, a firm known for its human-centered and sustainable design approach. Ti is also the founder of the Anthology Architecture and Design Festival, a platform that promotes architectural discourse in Southeast Asia.

== Early life and education ==
William Ti Jr. was born and raised in Tondo, Manila, where he developed an appreciation for the social and personal scale of urban spaces. His early exposure to city life influenced his architectural philosophy, particularly his focus on how spaces foster interaction and community engagement. As a child, Ti was an avid comic book enthusiast, drawing inspiration from Spider-Man comics to sketch cityscapes and buildings. His love for reading extended to fantasy and fiction novels, fueling his imagination and deepening his interest in design. Ti earned his bachelor's degree in architecture from the University of Santo Tomas (UST) in 2002. He later pursued a master's degree in urban design at the National University of Singapore (NUS), which he completed in 2012.

== Career ==
=== WTA Architecture and Design Studio ===
In 2007, William Ti founded WTA Architecture and Design Studio, a Manila-based firm specializing in urban planning, architecture, and commercial development. WTA is ranked one of Top 10 Architectural Firms in the Philippines by BCI Asia and World Architecture 100 Firms.

The studio is known for social architecture, a philosophy that prioritizes human-centered and sustainable design solutions.

In 2020, Ti expanded WTA's presence by opening an office in Shenzhen, China, aiming to establish a Philippine-based design firm as a major regional and global player.

=== Anthology Architecture and Design Festival ===
In 2016, Ti launched the Anthology Architecture and Design Festival, an annual event that gathers architects, designers, and urban planners to discuss contemporary issues in architecture and urbanism. The festival has since become a premier platform for architectural discourse in Southeast Asia.

== Notable projects ==
- Ferdinand E. Marcos Stadium – A 12,000 capacity stadium that pioneers an open stadium park concept.
- The Book Stop Project – A network of microlibraries that is completely free and open to the public.
- Pasig River Esplanade – A rehabilitation project of the 26 km Pasig River that runs through the middle of Metro Manila.
- BSP Security Plant Complex – Award-winning bank office building design.
- Horizon Manila – A large-scale urban reclamation project aimed at redefining Manila's waterfront.
- Emergency Quarantine Facilities (EQF) – A rapid-response COVID-19 facility that gained international recognition.

== Awards and recognition ==
- Archdaily Building of the Year (2025) – Ferdinand E. Marcos Stadium - Sports Category.
- Outstanding Professional of the Year Award (2023) – Awarded by the Philippine Regulation Commission - Architecture category
- Ani ng Dangal Award (2022/2023) – An annual award given by the National Commission for Culture and the Arts to honor Filipino artists and talent.
- Silver A’ Design Award (2022) – Architecture, Building, and Structure Design Category.
- B1M Construction Story of the Year (2021) – For Emergency Quarantine Facilities.
- WAFX Award (2021) – Overall Winner for the Horizon Manila project.
- Architizer A+ Award (2017) – The Bookstop Project - Jury and People's Choice Award - Institutional - Libraries.
