= Marco Sardillo =

9th Administrator of Intramuros
- In office August 5, 2013 – June 30, 2016
- Preceded by: Jose Capistrano
- Succeeded by: Guiller Asido

Executive Director of the Presidential Commission on Good Government
- In office 2010–2012

Personal details
- Born: Marco Antonio Luisito Villanueva Sardillo III
- Education: London School of Economics & Political Science; Lee Kuan Yew School of Public Policy - National University of Singapore Ateneo Law School Ateneo de Manila University

Marco Antonio Luisito Villanueva Sardillo III is a Filipino government official who previously served as the ninth Administrator of the Intramuros Administration, an attached agency of the Department of Tourism mandated with the authority to restore and guide the development of Intramuros, Manila. Prior to his appointment as Administrator of Intramuros, Sardillo was the executive director of the Presidential Commission on Good Government from 2010 to 2012.

Political offices
| Preceded by Jose Capistrano | Administrator of Intramuros; 2013–2016 | Succeeded by Guiller Asido |
