= Plaza de Roma =

Public square in Intramuros, Manila

- Public square
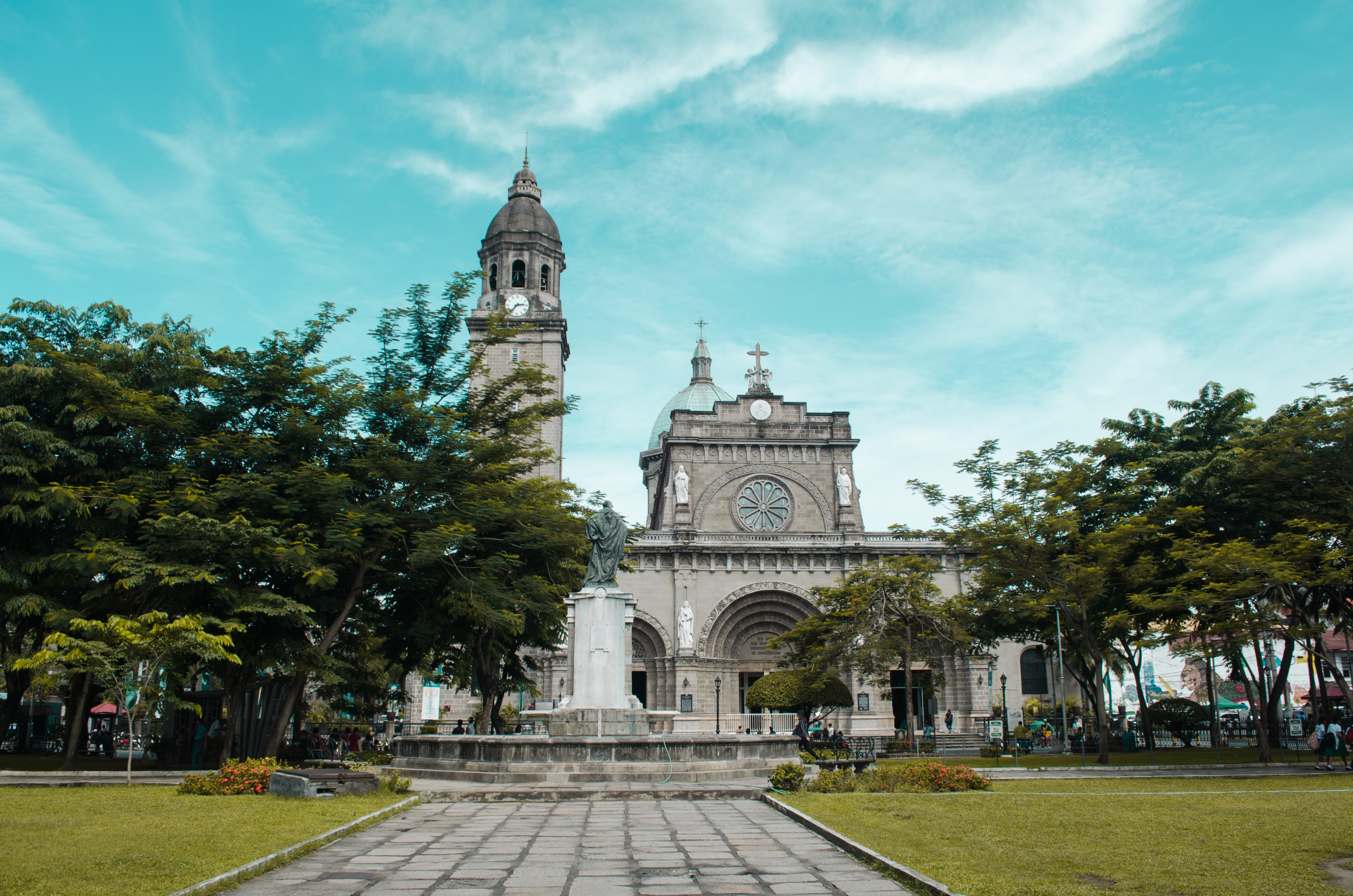
- Plaza de Roma is dominated by Manila Cathedral, the seat of the Archdiocese of Manila
- Location: Andrés Soriano Avenue, Intramuros; Manila, Philippines
- Interactive map of Plaza de Roma
- Coordinates: 14°35′32″N 120°58′23″E

Plaza de Roma, also known as Plaza Roma, is one of three major public squares in Intramuros, Manila. It is bounded by Andres Soriano Avenue (formerly Calle Aduana) to the north, Cabildo Street to the east, Santo Tomas Street to the south, and General Antonio Luna Street (formerly Calle Real del Palacio) to the west. The plaza is considered to be the center of Intramuros.

Plaza de Roma is also the location of the Book Stop Intramuros, a local unit of The Book Stop Project.

== History ==
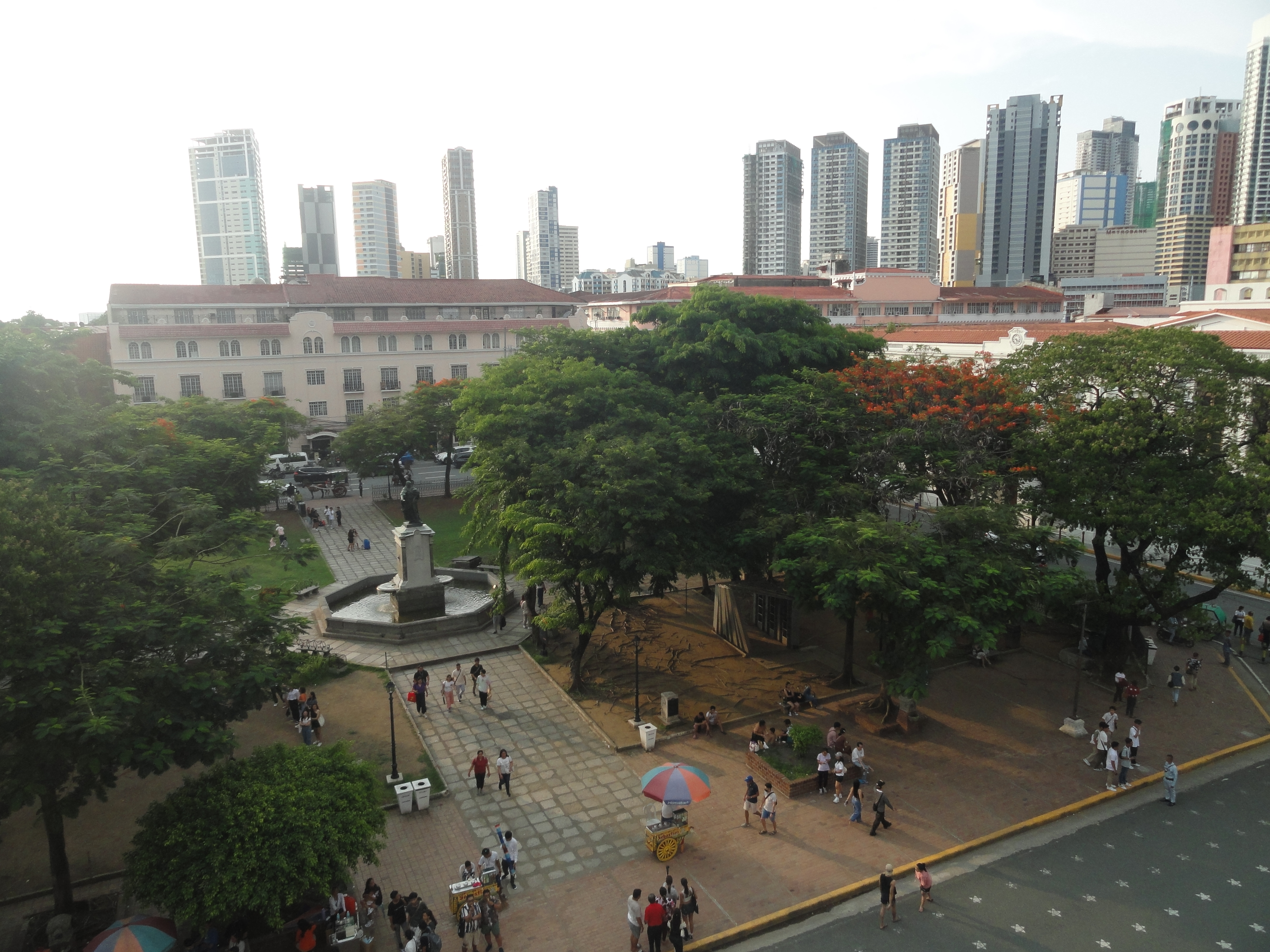
View from the Manila Cathedral.

During the Spanish period, the plaza was the Plaza Mayor of Manila, and was considered the center of the city. Bullfights and other public events were held in the plaza until Governor-General Rafael Maria de Aguilar converted it into a garden in 1797. It was often referred to as the Plaza de Armas, not to be confused with the Plaza de Armas inside Fort Santiago, during this time.

In 1901, with the start of American rule, the plaza was renamed Plaza McKinley, after U.S. President William McKinley, who authorized the colonization of the Philippines by the United States. The plaza was given its current name in 1961, following the elevation of Rufino Santos to the College of Cardinals of the Catholic Church as the first Filipino cardinal. In recognition of this, the city of Rome reciprocated by renaming one of its squares Piazzale Manila.

Its current configuration as a garden does not allow Plaza de Roma to function as a public square, like Plaza Miranda and Plaza Moriones. The Intramuros Administration plans to revert the square to its appearance in the Spanish Era.

== Surroundings ==
Plaza de Roma is surrounded by three important landmarks of Intramuros: the Manila Cathedral to the south, the Palacio del Gobernador to the west, and the Casas Consistoriales, also known as the Ayuntamiento de Manila, to the east. The Real Audiencia of Manila was located in proximity to the plaza during Spanish rule.

Location of buildings surrounding the Plaza de Roma
Eastern side
Northern side		Southern side
Building	Ayuntamiento de Manila [Casas Consistoriales] (Bureau of the Treasury)	Buildings
Shipping Center Building	King Charles IV Monument	Manila Cathedral
Fire Station/Philippine National Bank	Palacio del Gobernador (Intramuros Administration)	Parking Lot
Western side

== King Charles IV monument ==
At the center of Plaza de Roma is a monument to Charles IV of Spain which was erected in 1824 in his honor for having sent the first batch of smallpox vaccine to the Philippines. A fountain surrounding the monument was erected in 1886. In the 1960s, the monument was replaced with a monument dedicated to the Gomburza.

In 1978, President Ferdinand Marcos ordered the restoration of the Plaza de Roma along with other sites in Intramuros. The work was completed by the then-newly established Intramuros Administration in 1980 and the original Charles IV was re-installed in the plaza in 1981. The Gomburza monument was relocated to the site fronting the National Art Gallery Building of the National Museum.

== Book Stop Intramuros ==
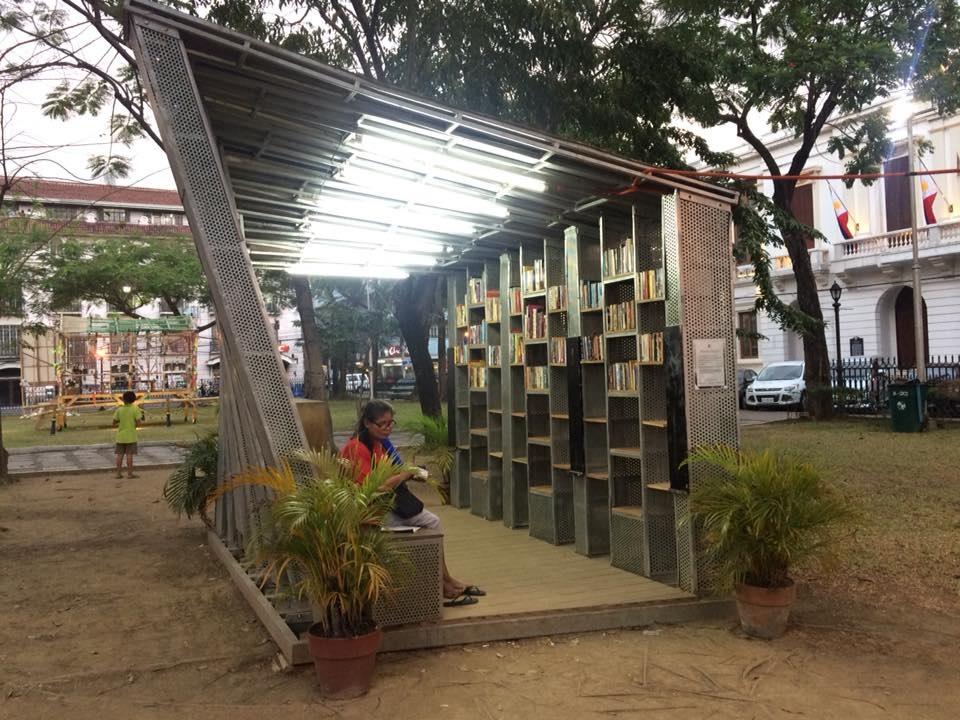
The Book Stop Intramuros in Plaza Roma.

The Plaza Roma is also the location of the Book Stop Intramuros, a local unit of The Book Stop Project.
