= 1896 Manila mutiny =

Philippine colonial uprising

- Part of Philippine Revolution
Date	December 5, 1896
Location	Intramuros, Manila, Captaincy General of the Philippines
Result	Spanish victory Filipino mutineers fail to take any military installations.

Belligerents
Filipino soldiers of the 2nd Company, Regiment No. 69	Spain; Guardia Civil, other Filipino troops loyal to Spain

Commanders and leaders
Felipe Cabrera de los Reyes (captured); Protasio Añonuevo (captured)	(Spain) ~Ramón Blanco y Erenas

Strength
Unknown	Unknown

Casualties and losses
7 captured, several killed or wounded	~2–3 killed or wounded

The 1896 Manila mutiny (Spanish: Motín de Manila) was a short uprising in a military installation in Manila, the capital and seat of the Spanish colonial Government in the Philippines. The skirmish was the only recorded incident of rebellion during the revolution that happened within the walls of Manila.

== Background ==
After the failed uprising by Andrés Bonifacio earlier in August, the Spanish government concentrated the majority of the Spanish-Native army in Manila against Bonifacio and his men, however, after barely a week of fighting, the Spanish army had successfully contained Bonifacio's campaign to mere hit-and-run raids on the hill towns of Montalban. The uprising in the surrounding provinces, particularly Cavite had caught the Spaniards' attention.

=== Battle of Binakayan ===
In November, 1896, Gov. General Ramon Blanco ordered a major offensive to stop the revolution in Cavite. The attack failed to even dent the province which was now firmly under rebel control. After the battle, a period of peace where townsfolk from all over southern Luzon escaped to Cavite, came to be known as "Ang Panahon ng Tagalog" or the Tagalog era.

== The mutiny ==
On the night of 5 December 1896, Corporal Cabrera De los Reyes and Bugler Protasio Añonuevo led the native conscripts from the 2nd Company of the 69th Regiment "Iberia" to attack their Spanish officers and capture the military installations around the walled city. However, due to poor planning, the mutineers were overpowered and De los Reyes and Añonuevo along with five of their men were captured. Actual fighting lasted barely an hour and the remaining mutineers surrendered themselves to the Spaniards.

=== Katipunan connection ===
The motives of the mutiny are unclear, though it is said to have been inspired by the various uprisings across Luzon particularly that of Cavite, none of the members of the regiment were suspected of being Katipuneros (soldiers of the Katipunan secret society) and they were simply inspired to rise up for freedom by the said uprisings. The two leaders of the mutineers and five of their men were brought to court for rebellion and mutiny and were executed in Bagumbayan field on 26 December 1896.

== Aftermath ==
The rebellion was barely notable to Manila society, being only a small skirmish initiated by native troops. The mutineers were put under the first of the numerous executions at Bagumbayan, the most famous of which was that of Dr. Jose Rizal.
