= Prehistory of Manila =

The prehistory of Manila covers the Pleistocene epoch along with the Paleolithic, Neolithic, and Metal ages. It also includes the age of contact with other countries like China, and ends with the period of the Kingdom of Maynila.

Manila is the present-day capital of the Philippines and is the second largest city in the country. It is situated at 14. 5833˚ N, 120.9667 ˚ E. It belongs to the list of cities worldwide with the highest population density of 42,858 per square kilometer.

== Etymology of Manila ==
=== City named after the plant ===
The term “Maynila” was said to be coined after the Yamstick Mangrove (Scyphiphora hydrophyllacea) or Nilad in local name. Nilad is a peculiar, stalky rice-like plant with flowers of bright white and yellow that was said to be abundant in the ancient kingdom.

Delgado (1982) records in his Historia General that shrubs of the Yamstick Mangrove, or Nilad, were abundant along the banks of the river where the city (which was a kingdom before) was established. The city Maynilad was said to be named after this plant, which means "there is Nilad".

According to Philippine folklore, when the Walled City (popularly known as Intramuros) was newly built, this peculiar plant proliferated in the delta of the Pasig River and Manila Bay. Back then, the Pasig River was clean enough for people to use for daily activities.

The local population came to regard the plant for its long, soft branches which swayed gently in the breezes which came in from the bay. According to folklore, the arm-like figure of the plant welcomes visitors or bids them farewell from along the riverbanks and seashore, and the land became noted by visitors for this peculiarity.

Inhabitants and visitors were said to come to the riverbank to pick the flower. Nilad was made into garlands or laces that were offered to religious altars and soon became products distributed to other places.

As the story went on, two Spaniards came and asked where the flowers came from. The woman who was at loss of the place where exactly the flowers are located answered vaguely, ‘Sa may mga Nilad’ (where the Nilads are). The native as well as foreigners began addressing the place ‘Sa may Nilad’ since then. Soon, people, be it the natives, the conquerors or visitors, came to know the area as ‘Sa Maynila.’

There are some argument among historians as to whether the plant was actually called "nila" or "nilad." Historians Ambeth Ocampo and Carmen Guerrero Nakpil assert that nila is popularly referred to as nilad by people unfamiliar with the plant. On his Facebook page, Ocampo notes that "Some idiot added a 'd' to give us: Maynilad, Maharnilad, and Lagusnilad! In Fr. Blanco's Flora de Filipinas circa 1877 we find the ixora manila. There is no "d" after nila."

A number of early sources disagree, however, noting that the plant referred to as "nilad" is the Indigo plant (Indigofera tinctoria), a different plant altogether. Emma Helen Blair, in the multi-volume collection of Philippine documents The Philippine Islands, notes "The name Manila is derived from a Tagal word, ' Manilad ', meaning 'a place overgrown with Nilad' which is the name of a small tree, bearing white flowers.

Julio Nakpil asserted that the dropping of the "d" at the end of the name was probably a mistake on the part of the Spaniards: "Maynilad seems to us reasonable for the following reason: the prefix 'may' means "to have" or "there is" (mayroon); and the prefix 'ma' means abundant (marami); and 'nilad' is a shrub, also called sagasa, growing profusely on the banks of Manila, and for that reason it was called Manilad before and after the coming of the Spaniards who, because of their defective pronunciation of our language, dropped the last letter, converting it into Manila."

Baybayin, the dominant precolonial writing system in the area, was also unable to transcribe ending consonants. This meant that spoken "Maynilad" (a place with "nilad") and "Manilad" (a place abundant with "nilad") will both be transcribed as "Manila" in the script, which may affect direct transcription in other languages.

=== City named after location ===
On the other hand, Alexander Salt suggested in his Introduction to the History of Manila that the city got its name from its location on the tongue of the land. Salt claimed that the term Maynila is from the Tagalog phrase sa may dila ("in the tongue") that mainly describes the location of the city in the tongue of the land mass.

Salt also cited in his work that Manila had been called the “Nuremberg of the East.” He clarified that may be it entirely correct or not, it is at least "full of suggestions" as “She (Manila) alone, amid the hurry of twentieth century civilization, and the characteristics of the Orient, sits serene in the medieval grandeur.” The history, as Salt expounded, had the walls, the buildings, the squares and the streets as its witnesses. He had seen the city as an expression of life and growth, not mere arbitrary counters of thought.

== Prehistory ==
=== Historical geology of Manila ===
Just like every other piece of land, the City of Manila started millions of years ago, even before it emerged by the Pasig River, as an integral part of the cataclysmic evolution in the development of the major geological framework of the Earth. Mainly, the causal relationship between Sierra Madre Range along the East coast of Luzon and the Central Valley in the middle of the mountain range and two other highlands, Zambales along the west and the highlands in the present provinces of Laguna, resulted to where the city stands now.

The Pasig River has been a factor that contributes to the ability of Manila to sustain life and habitation. A large part of the Cavite area, which was part of the submarine ridge of the ancient Taal Volcano became uplifted and raised within a differential displacement. This occurred near the Tagaytay ridge taking advantage of the southward projection of the Marikina fault line, and the crustal movements include areas as far as north as Parañaque. The zone of the said differential displacement is the site where the present Pasig River is situated.

=== Pleistocene ===
With the formation of the Pasig River, Manila was said to be prepared for the coming of man. To have a better understanding of how the habitation and community started, one should take the macro level of understanding how humans have travelled and settled in the Philippines. During this period, the area where the City of Manila was situated was still inconclusive but this period is necessary for all events that happened contributed to the social and physical reality of the establishment and development of the city.

This period is known as an ice age. The change in climate was felt worldwide, even at the equator. This ice age resulted to the lower water levels of rivers, lakes and oceans. The South China Sea water level went down to an estimate of 240 feet. Then the period of ice age was over and as polar ice began to retreat and glaciers began to melt, bodies of water began to fill. These fluctuations in water level due to the alternating climate resulted to the alternate exposing and covering of land bridges that connected land masses. These land bridges, when exposed made migration possible, since the technology of sailing was not elaborate (or even present at that time). Records show that ancient man did not only come to the Philippines for a temporary shelter during climatic change, but also, they began to settle down. The ancient man, not being a specialized form of being, made several adjustments to cope up with a new environment. Cultural artifacts showed evidences of adjustments as later social scientists found.

Speculations said that man possibly arrived as early as 250,000 years ago (arguable and not conclusive) which was based on the association of the earliest forms of artifacts of human and fossils of extinct animals, which were also considered not so direct.

Elephant and Stegodon were believed to be roaming around the vicinities of Quezon City, and the rhinoceros in the area of the present-day Guadalupe in Mindanao. Water levels around this period was low, meaning portions of Manila bay just about Corregidor was exposed. It was only around the last glacial that the water level rise and the exposed area covered. The artifacts found showed that inhabitants were gradually moving towards the higher grounds.

=== Paleolithic age ===
The last period of glacial stage marked the beginning of man's enhanced ability to create more tools which helped him for the attainment of survival. The Paleolithic Age is characterized as the Old Stone Age which explicitly shows a manifestation that man used crude stones to suffice his need for efficient tools and weapons.

However, there is still no sufficient evidence that man stayed at the vicinity of Manila during this Age. The possibility remains that man could've stayed at some parts of Manila proper for a short period of time either for food or temporary settlements. There is no adequate evidence to prove that man established permanent habitation sites within the area of Manila proper although some regions relatively near Manila, like Cavite and Pampanga showed potential signs of settlements.

The coastal outline of the Philippines before is far more different from what is today. In this period, in the latter part of the last glacial age, the first definite traces of man were found. Manila Bay was exposed during this time and the sealine would be located outside Corregidor Island. The Pasig River would be a cutting channel through the bay area, depositing sediments onto the coastal plain, gradually increasing the area of the delta. The last period of glacial age also entails the man to be defined as a tool making being. From merely tool users to toolmaker and user, man had been used to drafting, manufacturing and using what is available in the environment.

No signs of man have been discovered in the present area of manila that could date back into this period. Speculations state that evidences might have been buried underneath the silt and sediments of Manila bay and covered by the rising water during the last interglacial period. But on higher ground, implements were discovered by Dr. H. Otley Beyer around the Novaliches area, place that were not inundated by the rise of oscillation of sea and/or not disturbed by the infiltration of human habitation.

Along the eastern and northeastern edges of Manila, artifacts were discovered along with tektites. The same types of material were found on the area of the present-day New Manila by Dr. H. Otley Beyer. Towards the north of Manila, other tektites and Paleolithic tools were excavated in impressive quantities. Although none of these were found in Manila proper (tektites were found in Quezon City, Rizal, and Bulacan), these findings still indicates the intense human activity in a very early period.

Though there is a certainty that early humans could have ventured into the delta of the Pasig River to search for food, there are still no traces of this appearance. In one or two instances, early man could have been in the area of Manila too. They could have settled for a short period or have lurked for the search of food

=== Neolithic age ===
This age is also known as the New Stone Age where there was an evident shift from hunting and gathering to the establishment of permanent settlements. The most significant change which took place during this period is the Agricultural Revolution. New tools also evolved which brought more efficiency to man. They created more refined and advanced tools. Complexity was also seen in their methods of making weapons. Just like in Paleolithic stage, there is still no sufficient evidence that man settled at the vicinity of Manila proper and established permanent habitation sites. The regions surrounding Manila showed considerable evidences of tools particularly in caves and rock shelters. The existence of shell adzes was also noted during this period.

During this period, the last of the four glacial period had already ended. Land bridges were already covered with the rising water level. The islands in the Philippines became separated, more or less as they are now. The Manila bay shoreline went back to the foot of Guadalupe Tuff.

The technology of tool making is more evidently developed that before. There was consistency in the method of manufacture; tools were with more definitive form which was achieved through secondary retouching. Tools gained more permanence. Tools had a distinctive attribute of a more elongated form and the working edge was situated on one edge, and the body had shape that is more symmetrical.

In the vicinity of Manila, signs of the Neolithic life has been found but not in the area itself because it was still a developing delta which is not a desirable permanent habitation. In the higher areas, Dr. H. Otley Beyer has uncovered present city evidences of Neolithic culture. To name a few, stone adzes had been found in the old provincial building in the province of Rizal, in Pasig. There were also a few rare shouldered adzes dated 2000 years BC, together with ‘Luzon Ridged Adze’ in the river valley of San Juan, the upper Novaliches and Marilao valleys.

The concentration of artifacts discovered by Dr. Beyer might be an indication of habitation. In the present day San Francisco del Monte area, an extensive deposition of damaged polished adze were found with worn-out flake tools mode of obsidian, or volcanic glass and tektites. In the San Juan River area, Dr. Beyer recognized what could have been an ancient trading center, and perhaps small communities on both banks of the river and at the creek that entered the river at one point.

The Pasig River, which is connected to the bay of the Laguna area would have been an avenue for trade. Trade had begun developing even in a small scale.

Evidently, boats were also being developed, and pottery was introduced.

=== Metal age ===
It is marked by the development of weaving and glass technology.

Settlements began to develop on lakeshores or seashores or wherever there was a body of water, since man became more mobile with the development of boats. Trade and commerce emerged from limited bartering groups. The range of trade became wider as more distant group became linked together by the development of boats as a means of transportation.

There are no archaeological findings in the area of Manila to represent this period as in the previous stages. The artifacts recorded were again, from the vicinities of the area.

It is positive that the Manila area was becoming the path for commerce with the inland communities to the southeast about the Laguna de Bay area, and the high grounds to the north and northeast. With the increase of trade, settlements began to grow, becoming nucleated in form.

== History ==
=== Age of contact ===
The Manila deltaic plain had become more stabilized by this time and the higher lands compacted enough for habitation. The Pasig River which connects Laguna de Bay with Manila Bay would have been by now an integral part in the commerce and places for trade which became more extensive. They controlled the flow of trade as they received goods from the foreign traders, and then traded them with the people of Laguna. The Chinese began to follow them and compete with the Arab trade in the Philippines. During the Sung and Ming dynasty, Manila served a major role in trades as they are one of the major seaports.

The over-all effect of this trade and commerce was the restructuring of the country’s culture and society. The intermingling of these cultures may be supported by the first concrete evidence found by the National Museum (the first archaeological excavations done by the museum). The archaeological findings in the Santa Ana area gave a definitive data on the patterns of the way of life of the people about 12th century AD. Seventy eight graves had been uncovered in an ancient more along the old Lamayan road.

=== Namayan ===
Namayan was the oldest kingdom among the three states present before the Spanish invaded the Philippines. The state was located near Manila Bay, Pasig River, and Laguna de Bay. Its capital was Sapa, what is now Santa Ana, Manila. Its territory also reached present day Mandaluyong, Makati, and Pasay. It was ruled by Lakantagkan with his wife, Buwan. Fr. Felix de Huerta published a book describing Namayan.

An excavation of a church in Santa Ana (Parish of Our Lady of the Abandoned) led by Robert Fox yielded great results. Chinese porcelain bowl was discovered which dated about late 11th century A.D. Chinese artifacts and other potteries dating 12th to 13th century were discovered as well.

=== Maynila (historical polity) ===
The early inhabitants of Maynila were engaged in trade relations with its Asian neighbors as well as with the Hindu empires of Java and Sumatra, as confirmed by archaeological findings. Trade ties between China became extensive by the 10th century, while contacts with Arab merchants reached its peak in the 12th century.

=== Tondo (historical polity) ===
Tondo was located at the northern part of Pasig River. As it is located at the center of regional trading route, it capitalized on the trade with China during the Ming dynasty and with other countries in Southeast and East Asia. It also has deep connections with the inhabitants of Brunei. The state fell to the Spaniards in 1571.

== Lifestyle in prehistory Manila ==
=== Social organization ===
The early Filipino people, anciently referred to as Ma-I, are widely considered to belong in one race. The groups, coming to the Philippines in boats called balangay, each occupied an area of land. As the members of each group are relatives, they lived together and recognized the oldest as their chief. Each group lived independently of the others, each of them forming a small state.

Their society was family-based and divided into three classes: the nobles, freemen and slaves.

The nobles, the chiefs and principales, were called datu or rajah (the term when used in modern Tagalog has under Spanish influence been hispanized as raha). The word datu comes from Malay datuk which means "chief of the family." These titles were acquired by inheritance, but more frequently by individual merit, based on personal influence, wealth, energy or high moral virtues, according to Fathers San Antonio and Colin. According to Morga (1961), these privileges were inherited only in the male line, from the father to son and the latter’s descendants; and in the absence of these, the brothers and collateral relatives were also inherited. Meanwhile, the plebeians were what the Bisayans called timawa and the Tagalogs maharlika. These were the descendants and relatives of the chiefs who did not inherit the rank, and also those slaves and their descendants whom their masters had emancipated.

Slavery was introduced for the first time. over two thousand years 880 by one called Sidumaguer (Si Dumagued, or Si Dumaguit?) in his own town of Languiguey on the island of Bantayan (Cebu?) because the natives there had killed his family. This Dumaguer might possibly be a bungling reminiscence of the god Dumagid of the Igorots, referred to by H.O. Beyer in his article “Myths Among Mountain Peoples” published in the Philippine Journal of Science, April 1913, p. 110.

Among the Bisayans, the slaves were three kinds: the ayuey, the tumarampuk, and the tumataban. The slave ayuey had to work three days for his master and one day for himself. His wife also served the master. In case of sale or indemnity for his death, the price fixed was two taels of gold, or twelve pesos. His master had to furnish him food and clothing.The slave tumarampuki worked three days for himself and one day for his master. His wife and children also worked for his master, weaving cotton for him fifteen days a month. His price was the same as that of the ayuey: twelve pesos. The slave tumataban served his master only when the latter had a festival in his house. Then this slave went there with some presents. In case of death of his master he inherited jointly with the master's children. He had to serve his master for fifteen days every month or else give five chcubites of rice every year. The price paid for him was six pesos. His wife also weaved cotton for the master.

Among the Tagalogs there were two kinds: the aliping-namamahay, and the aliping-saguiguilir. The aliping-namamahay lived in his own house, served his master in harvesting half of his crop, according to the agreement previously had and was bound to row for his master when the latter made a trip by water. He could dispose of his property and neither he nor his sons could be sold. The slave aliping-saguiguilir lived in the house of his master, and served him there and in his master's land. By showing diligence, he could be considered a higher class of slave and could not be sold.

Each aristocratic group or state was called barangay, and was headed by a datu. It can be inferred that the highest chief had in himself the three branches of the government, the executive, legislative, and judicial. The principales and the elders act as his delegates, especially in judiciary where they have the same role as a jury.

On the subject of realty, Morga (1961) reported that the concept of real property was already in existence even before the Spanish arrived. Each member of the community could have his own portion of land which would be regarded as the territorial limits of the community. One could acquire land by four methods: 1) he could acquire it himself, 2) he could purchase the land from a previous owner, 3) he could inherit the land, or 4) the land could be donated to him.

This only applied to open land which could be legally claimed, i.e., land free of liens and encumbrances, and it could be used for both habitation or cultivation. Forest lands used for agricultural purposes, on the other hand, would be taken into consideration depending on the accepted territorial range each community had agreed upon.

Purchasing or donation of land only applied to those who were members of the community with increased resources and/or to a non-member penetrating the community.

=== House structures ===
Houses were built in a more or less similar manner, the same way that the settlement were built beside rivers and streams. The house were generally built near rice fields and coconut groves and orchards. The houses can be defined by the type of economic activity and were set on posts raised above the ground. The rooms were small, and generally, with a single multipurpose room having only the cooking area differentiated among the areas in the houses. There is a particular architectural piece called ‘batalan’ usually situated on the rear part of the house and is utilized for various domestic work like washing, bathing, water storage, etc. The houses were made of raw material like wood and bamboo. Tree houses or houses built on trunk of trees rooted to the grounds were seen as an advantageous position.

The doors of the houses were usually oriented to the direction where the sun rises and never faced towards the west, which can be explained by the values and belief systems these people have.

=== Religion and its influence ===
The early Tagalogs have a term ‘sambahan’ designated as a place for worship. The word may also denote a makeshift prayer structure built for special occasions as in the offering of animal sacrifices during curing séances or ‘pag-aanito.’

Their manner of offering sacrifices was to offer to the deities the animals for different reasons. It can be for a feast, thanksgiving or to ask for healing.

To what many refer to as Paganism, this offering may be led or mediated by the officiating priest called ‘catalonan,’ which varies in name for different dialects but still refers to the one and the same role. Bathala was the supreme being of the ancient Tagalog, to whom they address their worship and prayers aside from the deities.

According to Garcia (1979) the laws of land were given by the goddess Lubluban. In the 5th article of the Code of Calantiao, irreverence to the sacred places and to certain trees was punished with one month's labor, or, in lieu thereof, by a fine in gold or money, and recidivism was punished by slavery for five years. In article 6, the cutting of sacred trees and the killing of a shark or streaky alligator was visited with capital punishment. In article 8, the killing of a bird called manaul (a bird of prey) was punished by whipping for two days. Article 11 punished with drowning the destruction or throwing away of the anitos (gods).Article 12 punished with a half-days' stay among the ants killing of a black cat on a new moon day. Article 14 punished with the whipping or eating of the meat of sacred insects or herbs, the injuring or killing of the brood of the bird manual or of a white monkey. Article 15 punished with the amputation of the fingers, the breaking of idols or wood or clay during olangan (a religious ceremony), and the breaking of sacred gravers used in killing pigs, or the breaking of drinking vessels. And article 15 punished with the capital penalty the violation of temples and sepultures, and things of diwatas (female deities).

The penetration of the Islamic religious scheme may have been assimilated in the Southern Philippines but was not far more advanced in the Manila area before the coming of the Spaniards. If this was considered to be the case, one can tell that the social organization was in rudimentary form since structure of religion is conveyed by the political scheme.

=== Writing ===
The ancient Tagalogs had their own system of writing called baybayin, which was a form of syllabification. No one has been exempted in the knowledge of reading and writing, even women. Writing was done on barks of wood or bamboo and characters were incised with a stylus. However, this form of writing is not meant for recording events or histories but for mere communication. This kind of writing persisted into the Spanish period where it was more developed.

=== Defense ===
The territorial and maritime jurisdiction of the land reached where the activity, strength and valor of their subjects could keep and defend it against the other groups. There existed three causes for the declaration of a just war: 1st, when a subject of a state was killed in another jurisdiction without good reasons; 2nd, when any person belonging to one state abducted a woman of another state; 3rd, when a subject was deceived or mistreated in another jurisdiction.

To prevent and resist surprise attacks from enemies, Manila fortified its city by building walls made of palm trees and stout wooden posts that they filled with earth and soil. They also placed bronze culverines in strategic locations. Houses were usually located inside the fort. The chiefs of Manila were said to be able to organize a troop with over 2,000 men anytime to defend the city from outside attacks.
