= Gomburza National Monument =

Bronze statue in Manila, Philippines

- Pambansang Bantayog ng Gomburza
- The monument in 2009 facing the Old congress building.
- Interactive map of Gomburza National Monument
- Location: Padre Burgos Ave., Manila
- Coordinates: 14.58719°N 120.98031°E
- Designer: Solomon Saprid
- Material: Bronze
- Height: 4.87 m (16.0 ft)
- Dedicated to: Gomburza (Mariano Gomes, Jose Burgos, and Jacinto Zamora)

National Historical Monument

The Gomburza National Monument is a bronze monument in the Philippines dedicated to the three Catholic martyr-priests Fathers Mariano Gomes (Note: Originally, the last name was spelled Gomez but was changed to Gomes due to two other priests in Cavite and Laguna had the same name. Some experts claim that it was a way to localize his name. Reference: https://abtheflame.net/culture/2024/02/gomburza-thomasian-priests-who-changed-history/ . Both spellings are used in the article, but refer to the same person.), Jose Burgos and Jacinto Zamora who were executed via garrote by the Spanish colonial authorities in 1872 on charges of subversion arising from the 1872 Cavite mutiny.

== Background ==
The 1872 mutiny in Cavite was an uprising of about 200 native troops and laborers which many accounts detail that its main purpose was to get rid of the Spanish government; however, this agreed by many scholars that the event was exaggerated to legitimize the persecution and execution of those who they perceived to be threats to their power. Among which was Fr. Jose Burgos, a Filipino priest pushing for the secularization of the Philippines, which, in their own capacities was also advocated by Fr. Mariano Gomes and Fr. Jacinto Zamora. The trio, under largely dubious evidence, were charged with subversion and was executed by garrote in Luneta de Bagumbayan, on February 17, 1872.

Jose Rizal, brother of Paciano, who was a close friend of Burgos, dedicated his second novel, El filibusterismo, in honor of the three martyr-priests. Rizal's writings subsequently led to the Spanish colonial government charging him for rebellion, sedition and conspiracy, and was executed via firing squad in Bagumbayan, Manila, on December 30, 1896.

Many scholars such as Zaide describe that the unfair trial and execution of the priests was the birth of Filipino nationalism that eventually led to the Propaganda movement and subsequent revolution culminating in the declaration of independence in 1898.

== Commission, creation and inauguration ==
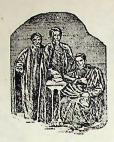
Logo used by the Burgos-Gomez-Zamora Centennial Commission prior to the design of the monument

Executive Order no. 155, s. 1968, created the Burgos-Gomez-Zamora Centennial Commission, which was tasked to create programs and activities commemorating the martyrdom of the three priests. Among these programs were the sponsorship of a national competition that would build a monument that would "immortalize the martyrdom and aspirations of GOMBURZA for the Filipino nation".

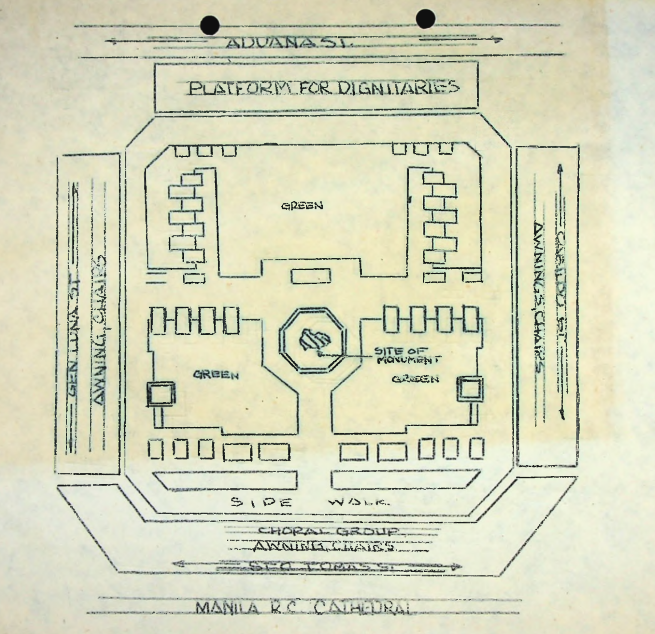
Seating layout for the inauguration of the Gomburza monument in Plaza de Roma, Intramuros, Manila, in 1972

Five sculptors were invited to participate, of which, only four were submitted on time. Solomon A. Saprid, a Filipino contemporary sculptor, was selected by the jury as the winner of the competition. A model of the statue was exhibited in the Cultural Center of the Philippines in 1971 along with a mural by Jaime Arevalo de Guzman. A concrete replica of the monument was supposedly donated to the town of Bacoor, Cavite, where Fr. Gomes last assigned as parish priest and in Vigan, Ilocos Sur, where Fr. Burgos was born. However, letters showed that followups made by Chairman Zalvidar to then-mayor of Bacoor, Pablo Gomez Sarino, regarding the proposed location of the monument went unanswered.

The bronze monument was funded by public donation and was completed in time for the Gomburza centennial in 1972. The pedestal was built by Edilberto B. Santiago, which also handled the transportation of the monument from the Saprid workshop in Quezon City. Meanwhile, brass markers made by Crispulo Zamora and sons was also installed. The monument had a budget of 203,000 Philippine pesos. The statue was installed in Plaza de Roma, Intramuros, Manila, inaugurated by then President Ferdinand Marcos and first lady Imelda Marcos.

== Design ==
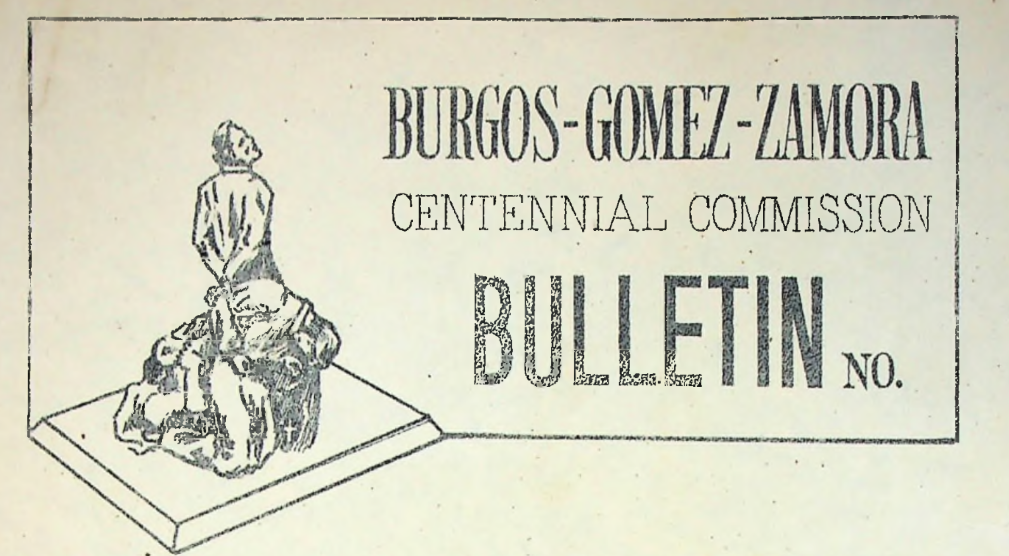
The Gomburza monument markup used as a header for the Burgos-Gomez-Zamora Centennial Commission bulletins

In a letter by Carmen Guerrero-Nakpil, a commission member, to the commission president Onofre D. Corpuz, she asked the latter to reconsider a previously agreed upon rule of the monument design competition that would allow entries to be more non-representational or modern "to express a 100-year-old event in 20th century idiom".

The selected design was that of Solomon A. Saprid, a Filipino expressionist sculptor and professor recognized for his contemporary take on depictions of Filipino mythological creatures such as the Tikbalang series.

The monument is made of bronze plates welded together to form an allegorical composition of the three martyr-priests. Two lifeless bodies, that of Gomes and Zamora are on the foreground, while the central figure Burgos is standing up, looking at the skies in what could be described as a pleading but dignified pose.

The monument, which originally stood in Plaza de Roma, was designed to face east towards the Ayuntamiento de Manila, but this was changed by the commission to face south towards the Manila Cathedral.

Later in its transferred site in Padre Burgos Ave., architect Jose Ramon Faustmann of the Intramuros Administration added a low square pool and fountain, where the monument would be placed in the middle, as if the monument was rising from the water.

== Later history ==
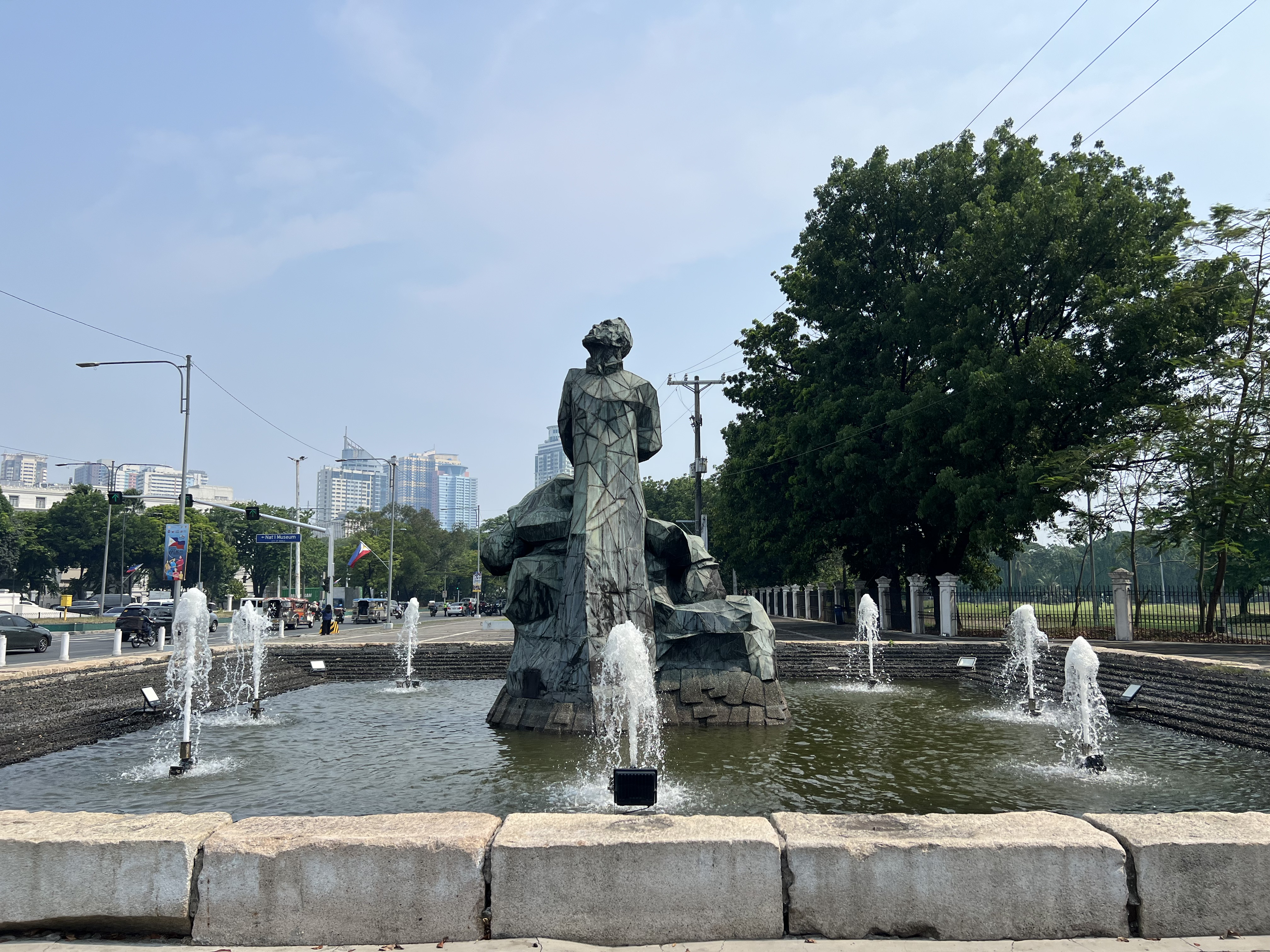
The monument in 2026

In 1978, President Ferdinand E. Marcos in Letter of Instruction no. 733 ordered the restoration of several parts of Intramuros, which included Plaza de Roma. The monument was removed and re-installed in 1980 in its current location in Padre Burgos Ave. in front of the old Congress building (now the National Museum of Fine Arts of the Philippines). Its environs were renamed Liwasang Gomburza (Gomburza Park). This location was deemed more suitable as it was closer to the site of their martyrdom. Arch. Jose Ramon Faustmann led its transfer to its current site.

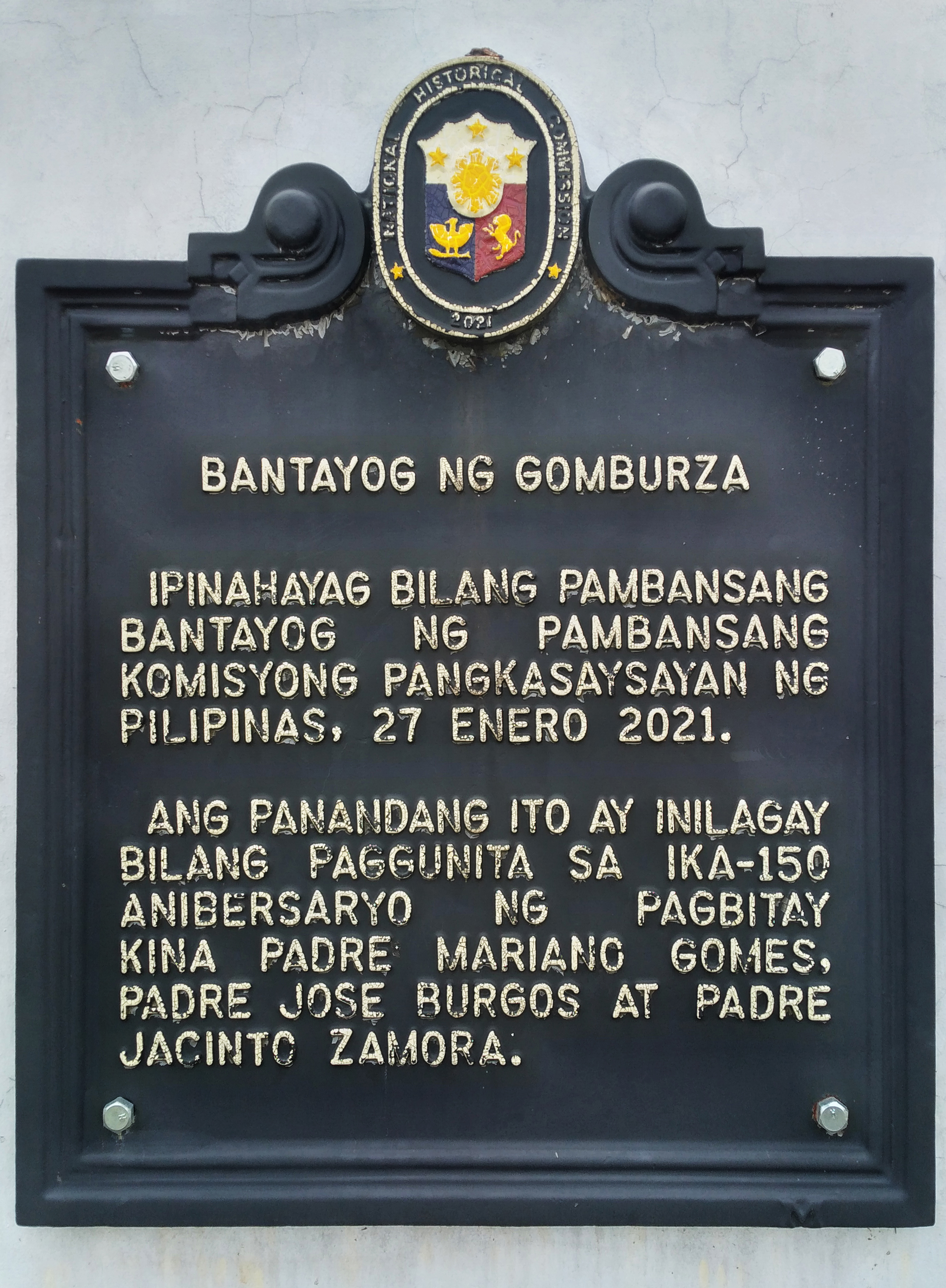
Bantayog ng Gomburza NHCP historical marker

Urban blight and neglect from officials saw the park become a location of squalor. Furthermore, confusion over its jurisdiction, whether it was owned by the National Museum of the Philippines or the Intramuros Administration, hampered plans of revitalization.

In 2017, the partnership of the National Museum of the Philippines and the Intramuros Administration led through a 15-million peso grant which saw the revival of the park and its monument. This restoration was completed in 2018.

In 2019, RA 11333 signed by President Rodrigo Duterte, integrated the park to Intramuros as National Cultural treasure. Furthermore, the law settled the jurisdiction of the National Museum of the Philippines, being the primary government entity responsible for the preservation and development of the site and its monument.

In 2021, the National Historical Commission of the Philippines declared the site a Pambansang Bantayog (National Monument) by virtue of Resolution no. 1, s. 2021, only the seventh monument in the country to be declared as such. A historical marker was installed by the same government body in preparation of the 150th anniversary of their martyrdom the following year.
