= Intramuros Administration =

Agency of the Philippines

- Logo of the IA

Agency overview
- Formed: April 10, 1979; 47 years ago
- Jurisdiction: Intramuros, Manila
- Headquarters: Palacio del Gobernador, Intramuros, Manila
- Employees: 45 (2024)
- Annual budget: ₱107,961,000 (2021)
- Agency executive: Atty. Joan M. Padilla, Administrator
- Parent department: Department of Tourism
- Website: intramuros.gov.ph

The Intramuros Administration (IA) is an agency of the Department of Tourism of the Philippines that is mandated to restore, administer, and develop in an orderly manner the historic walled area of Intramuros, which is situated within the modern city of Manila, as well as to ensure that the 16th- to 19th-century Philippine-Spanish architecture remains the general architectural style of the walled area.

It operates autonomously from the municipal government, although the mayor of Manila is a member of its board. It was established on April 10, 1979, as under the now-defunct Ministry of Human Settlements by virtue of Presidential Decree 1616 issued by President Ferdinand Marcos. Executive Order No. 120 reorganized the Ministry of Tourism which became the Department of Tourism (DOT) on January 30, 1987. The order also designated the IA as an attached agency of the DOT.

Its office is located at Palacio del Gobernador in Plaza Roma.

== History ==
On October 30, 2015, the Association of UNESCO World Heritage Cities of Spain awarded the IA the Heritage Prize 2015 for its efforts in preserving Spanish colonial architecture in Intramuros. IA, however, was flagged by the Commission on Audit for its delayed implementation of an ₱18 million branding campaign that was awarded way back in 2017. ₱450,000 has been used so far. None of the project components: events and special projects, branding materials, online campaign, walking tour brochures and maps, and other printed media, were completed at all.

=== Register of Styles ===
The Intramuros Register of Styles is the main architectural code of Intramuros, the historic core of the City of Manila, Philippines. It became part of Presidential Decree No. 1616, as amended, when it was gazetted by the Official Gazette of the Philippines on June 17, 2022. The Intramuros Administration is the agency of the Philippine Government responsible for the implementation of the Register of Styles.

Intramuros in Manila is the only locality in the Philippines where, for cultural reasons, the use, height, scale, and aesthetics of all new constructions and development are pre-determined and strictly regulated under the force of a national law. The Register of Styles, as an integral part of Presidential Decree No. 1616, is the main legal document prescribing and guiding the implementation of pre-war architectural colonial styles in Intramuros.

The Register of Styles is the first document to detail the historical styles of Intramuros. It was authored by Rancho Arcilla, who was then the Archivist of the Intramural Administration, and under the initiative of Guiller Asido, the former Administrator of Intramuros. Being an integral part of Presidential Decree No. 1616, the Register of Styles is the only architectural stylebook in the Philippines with the force and potency of a national law.

By form, the urban landscape of Intramuros mostly lacked setbacks, with buildings that were mostly terraced (rowhouses). Courtyards or backyards were exceptionally well adapted to the climate. By style Intramuros was described as both vernacular and cosmopolitan. While its Church and State buildings were European in orientation, albeit adapted and localized, most of the buildings enclaved within its walls embraced tropical vernacular constructions as exemplified by the Bahay na bato. Churches, fortifications, and palaces fashioned in European styles, though few, became icons and objects of popular imagination. In contrast, the vernacular Bahay na Bato, which was adopted in majority of buildings, prevailed in terms of number of constructions.

The Register of Styles prescribes the Bahay na bato as the default style for new constructions in Intramuros. It explicitly recognized the Bahay na Bato as the dominant architectural typology of Intramuros during the Spanish colonial era until the destruction of the Walled City in 1945 during the Second World War. Pursuant to the Intramuros Register of Styles, new constructions in Intramuros that do not follow the Bahay na Bato typology may only be allowed only in specific locations where a Non-Bahay na Bato structure (e.g. a Neoclassical building) was known to exist. Otherwise, new constructions are required to follow the Bahay na Bato type.

== Administrators ==
	Administrator	Term start	Term end	Appointed By
1	Jaime C. Laya	April 10, 1979 (Note: Served as Action Officer of the Intramuros Administration from April 10, 1979 to April 16, 1986.)	April 16, 1986	Ferdinand Marcos
2	Eustacio Orobia	November 14, 1986	July 31, 1989	Corazon Aquino
3	Jose Capistrano	August 1, 1989	April 19, 1990	Corazon Aquino
4	Edda V. Henson	April 1990	October 1995	Corazon Aquino
5	Carlo Q. Butiong	February 15, 1996	February 17, 1997	Fidel Ramos
6	Dominador Ferrer	August 12, 1998	August 13, 2007	Joseph Ejercito Estrada
7	Anna Maria L. de Harper	March 17, 2008	July 8, 2010	Gloria Macapagal Arroyo
8	Jose Capistrano	August 27, 2010	August 5, 2013	Benigno S. Aquino III
9	Marco Antonio Luisito V. Sardillo III	August 5, 2013	June 30, 2016	Benigno S. Aquino III
	Merceditas de Sahagún	June 30, 2016	March 23, 2017	Interim Officer-In-Charge
10	Guiller B. Asido	March 23, 2017	June 30, 2022	Rodrigo Duterte
11	Joan Padilla	January 17, 2023	Incumbent	Bongbong Marcos
