= Official Gazette (Philippines) =

Public journal of the government of the Republic of the Philippines

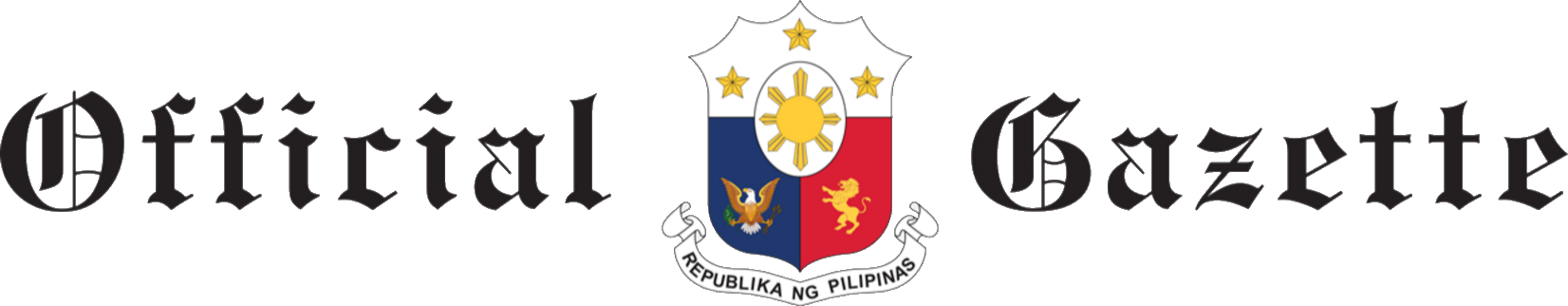

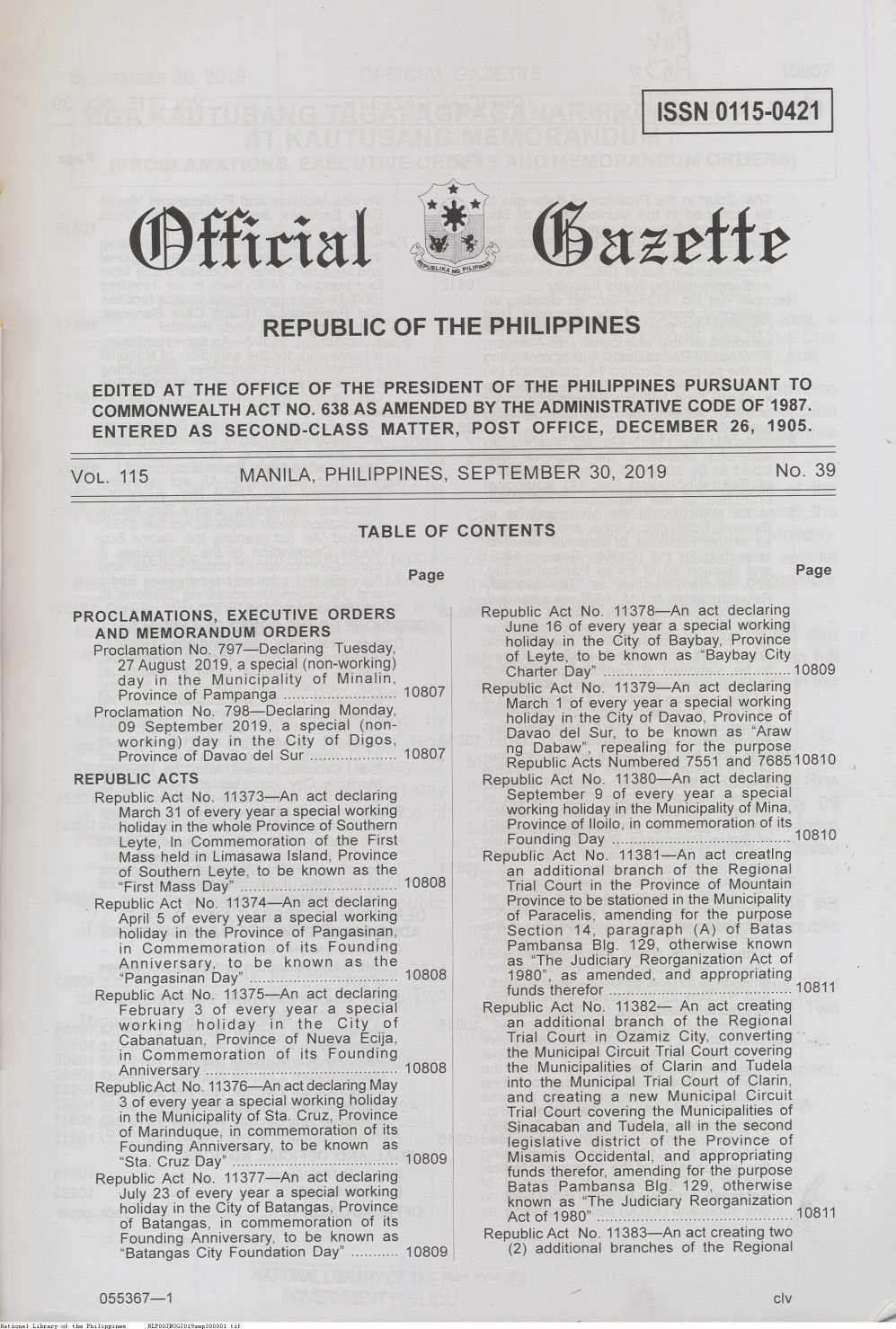
- Official Gazette, Volume 115, Number 39, September 30, 2019
- Founded: 1902
- Country: Philippines
- Language: Filipino, English; Spanish (formerly)
- Website: officialgazette.gov.ph

The Official Gazette, which is printed by the National Printing Office (NPO), is the public journal and main publication of the government of the Philippines. Its website only uploads what has been published; it is managed by Presidential Communications Office (PCO). (Note: Based on the attribution found in the footer of Official Gazette website)

== History ==
During the Spanish colonial period, there existed many publications by the government authorities in the islands. In 1852, the Boletín Oficial de Filipinas was created by law and featured not only official government issuances but also local and international news and among others, serialized Spanish novels. It ceased publication by royal decree in 1860.

In 1861, it was revived as the Gaceta de Manila. This was the official gazette of the government in the Philippines which published government announcements, new decrees, laws, military information, court decisions, and the like. It also republished notices originally appearing in the Gaceta de Madrid which were relevant to the islands alongside decrees and other notices that required its publication in the Gaceta de Manila to take effect. By law, certain officials were required to subscribe to the Gaceta. Publication ceased on August 8, 1898, five days before the Americans occupied Manila during the Spanish–American War.

The Insular Government began their own official publication and the Official Gazette was created under Act No. 453, "An Act providing for the publication by the Insular Government of an Official Gazette, under the general direction of the Department of Public Instruction". Enacted by the Philippine Commission on September 2, 1902, it provided that the Gazette be published weekly in both English and Spanish. Vol. 1 No. 1 of the Official Gazette came out on September 10, 1902.

Act No. 664, enacted on March 5, 1903, amended the earlier Act No. 453 and provided for further distribution of the Official Gazette. The 2nd National Assembly of the Philippines passed Commonwealth Act No. 638, "An Act to provide for the uniform publication and distribution of the Official Gazette" on May 22, 1941, which was approved by President Manuel L. Quezon on June 10, 1941. The Spanish edition was last published in 1941.

Executive Order No. 200 issued by President Corazon C. Aquino signed on June 18, 1987, states "Laws shall take effect after fifteen days following the completion of their publication either in the Official Gazette or in a newspaper of general circulation in the Philippines".

On July 26, 2010, the online version of the Official Gazette was launched. Executive Order No. 4, signed by President Benigno S. Aquino III on July 30, 2010, placed editorial responsibilities for the Official Gazette under the Presidential Communications Development and Strategic Planning Office.

On July 3, 2018, the Official Gazette, along with around 116 government websites, became inaccessible due to hardware failure from six-year-old servers in need of upgrades. While the other sites returned online, the Official Gazette returned online by July 30.

== Contents ==
According to Section 1 of Commonwealth Act No. 638, the contents of the Official Gazette include the following:

- all important legislative acts and resolutions of a public nature of the Congress of the Philippines;
- all executive and administrative orders and proclamations, except such as have no general applicability;
- decisions or abstracts of decisions of the Supreme Court and the Court of Appeals as may be deemed by said courts of sufficient importance to be so published;
- such documents or classes of documents as may be required so to be published by law; and
- such documents or classes of documents as the President of the Philippines shall determine from time to time to have general applicability and legal effect, or which he may authorize so to be published
