= Plaza Moriones =

Square in Tondo, Manila, Philippines

- Public square
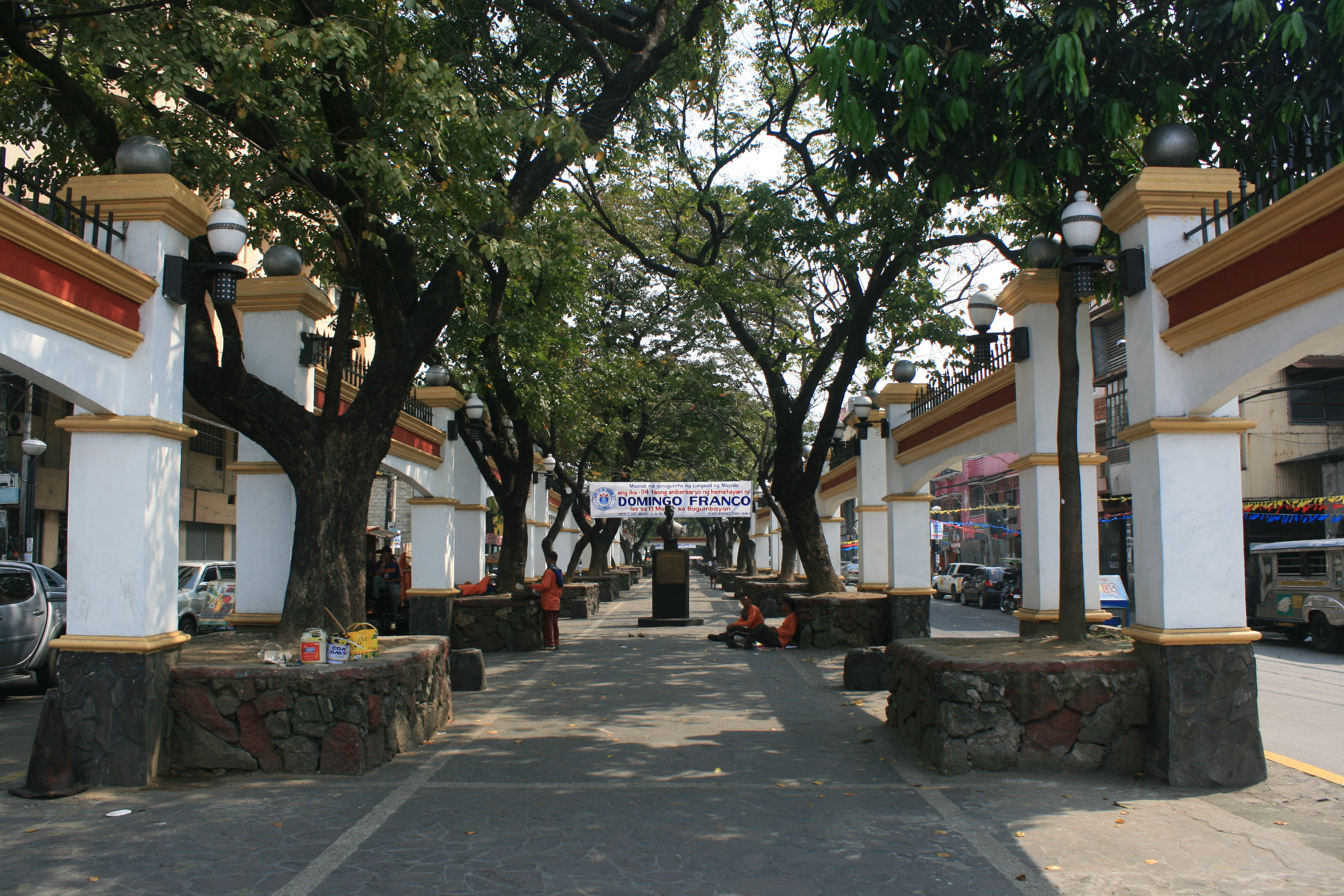
- For much of its length, Plaza Moriones is lined by several trees, bounded on both sides by Moriones Street.
- Dedicated to: Domingo Moriones y Muralla
- Owner: City of Manila
- Location: Moriones Street, Tondo; Manila, Philippines
- Interactive map of Plaza Moriones
- Coordinates: 14.60984°N 120.96773°E

Plaza Moriones is a major public square in Tondo, Manila. Unlike other squares in Manila, the plaza is in the shape of a linear park occupying the central median of Moriones Street, starting at the intersection of Moriones and Juan Luna Streets, and ending at the intersection with Santa Maria Street, bisected by Nicolas Zamora Street in the center. It is named after Governor-General Domingo Moriones y Muralla, responsible for the construction of Manila's sewerage system during his tenure from 1877 to 1881.

Originally an open green field lined with benches in colonial times, today the plaza is paved, with a size of 2,227 square meters (23,970 sq ft) and a capacity of 6,681 persons. Trees and benches line its entire length, and three fountains have been placed throughout the plaza. Flanked by paved roads, the central portion of the plaza resembles 19th century garden design with its plants such as bandera española (canna) flowers and palm trees. At the end of the plaza stands the Sigaw ng Tondo, a monument sculpted in 1978 by Eduardo Castrillo in memory of local victims fleeing Japanese forces during the Battle of Manila in 1945; it was inaugurated on March 17, 1978 with presidential couple Ferdinand and Imelda Marcos in attendance. In 2010, another monument was erected at the plaza in memory of Honorio Lopez, a Tondo-born playwright who fought in the Philippine Revolution. This monument was designed by Toym Imao.

Owing to its location in Tondo, a working-class area of Manila, Plaza Moriones serves as a center for Philippine political discourse, second only to Plaza Miranda in Quiapo in terms of importance. On May 1, 1903, thousands of members of the Unión Obrera Democrática Filipina, led by Isabelo de los Reyes, organized the Philippines' first Labor Day celebrations, with laborers such as tailors, mechanics, barbers and lithographers marching from the plaza to Malacañang Palace. Several years later, the Partido Komunista ng Pilipinas (PKP) was established on November 7, 1930, at a public rally held at the plaza, attended by six thousand people. Currently, Plaza Moriones is designated as one of five freedom parks in the City of Manila, where protests and rallies may be held without requiring permission from local authorities.

Beyond politics, Plaza Moriones is also significant for its location close to the Port of Manila: in 1906, the first nuns of the Order of Saint Benedict assigned to the Philippines arrived from Germany, landing at the plaza.
