= Tranvía =

Defunct streetcar system in Manila

- Tranvía de Filipinas
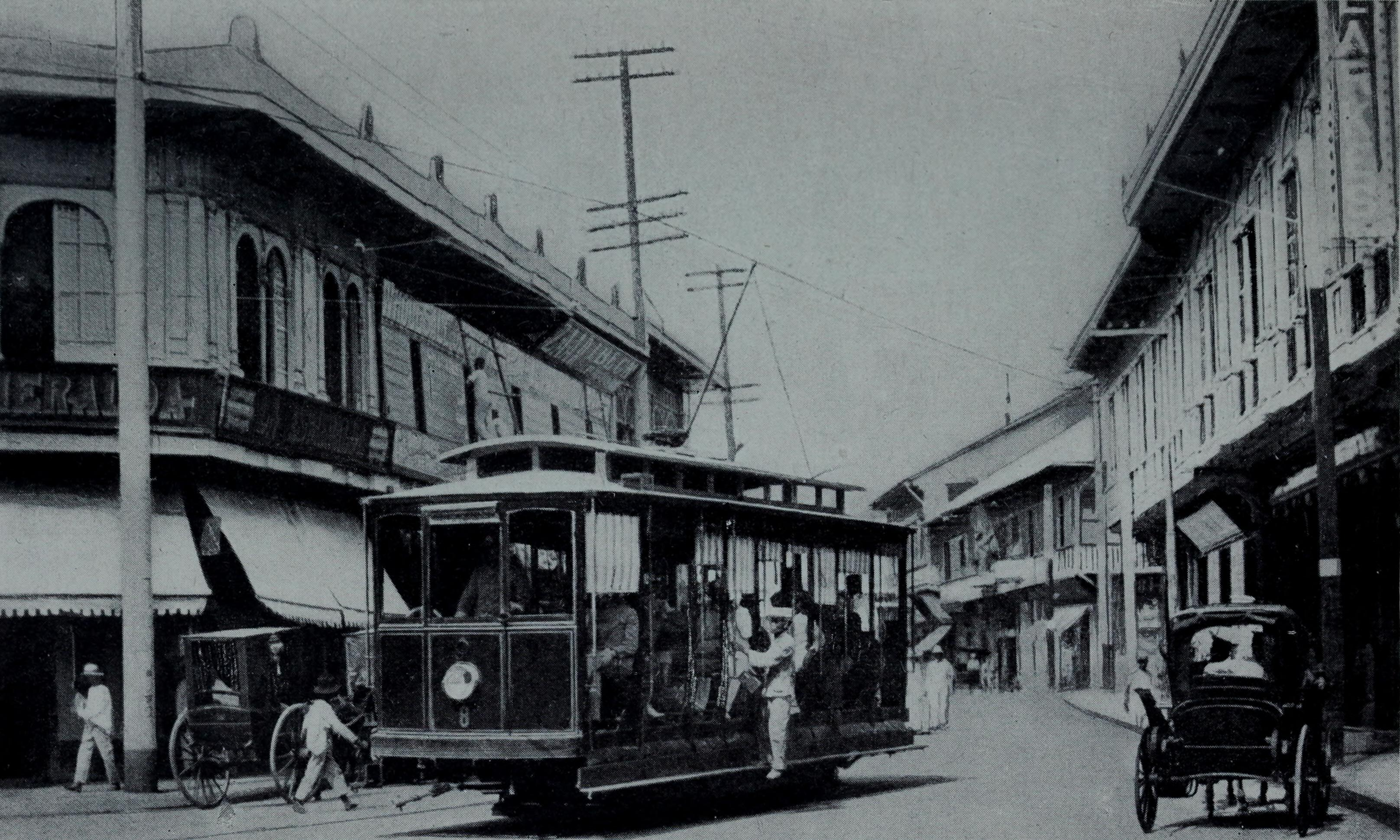

Operation
- Locale: Province of Manila (later City of Manila and Rizal), Philippines
- Open: 1888; 138 years ago
- Close: 1945; 81 years ago
- Status: Destroyed
- Owners: Compañia de Tranvías y Ferrocarriles de Filipinas →Meralco
- Operators: Compañia de Tranvías y Ferrocarriles de Filipinas →Meralco

Infrastructure
- Track gauge: 1,067 mm (3 ft 6 in)

Statistics
- 1913: 20,000 per car per month
Spanish colonial era: 1884–1900
- Status: Defunct
- Lines: Manila; Malate; Sampaloc; Azcarraga; Malabón
- Owner: Compañia de los Tranvías de Filipinas
- Operator: Compañia de los Tranvías de Filipinas
- Propulsion systems: Horse-drawn (1885–1900); Steam (1888–1905)
American colonial era: 1900–1945
- Status: Destroyed
- Lines: Existing lines: Intramuros (Note: The Intramuros Line was converted to an autobus line as it ceased operations in 1900.); Malate; Sampaloc, Manila; Azcarraga; Malabon; Additional lines: Pasig; Fort Mckinley
- Owner: Meralco
- Operator: Meralco
- Propulsion systems: Steam, Overhead electric
- Electrification: 500V overhead line
- Track length (single): 32.8 km (20.4 mi) (Note: Track length under Meralco operations as of June 30, 1907.)
- Track length (double): 12.7 km (7.9 mi)
- Track length (total): 45.4 km (28.2 mi)

The Tranvía was a streetcar system that served Manila and its surrounding cities during the late 19th century and the early years of the 20th century.

== History ==
Prior to the tranvia, modes of street transportation in Manila were mostly horse-drawn, consisting of the calesa, the lighter carromata, and the fancy caruaje. The tranvia served as the first railway transport to run in the Philippines, as in its earliest years the Ferrocarril de Manila–Dagupan are in its planning stages. The tranvia was renowned as "state-of-the-art" in East Asia, and had provided efficient transport to the residents of Manila.

=== Tranvias de Filipinas ===
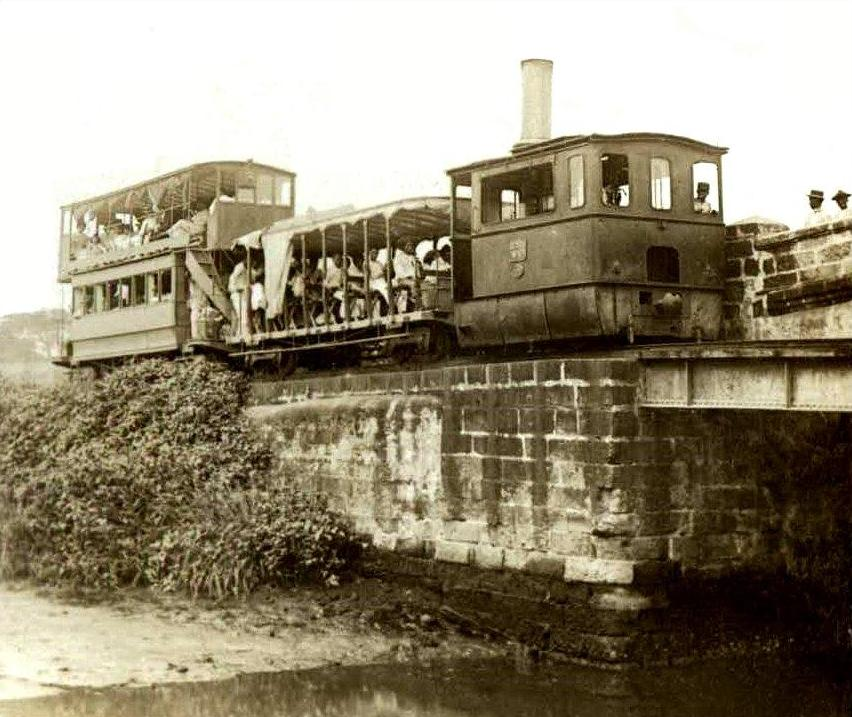
Steam-powered tranvia plying the Malabon Line.

During the Spanish colonial era, the tramway was referred to as the Tranvias de Filipinas. (Note: An image from the Manila Nostalgia photographic archives shows that the tramway was referred to as Tranvias de Filipinas) The decree in 1875 by King Alfonso XII initiated the planning for railways in the Philippines. The following year, in 1876, the Formularios para la reducion de los anteproyectos de ferrocarriles, prepared by the Administracion de Obras Publicas to identify the layouts of future railway documents. In the same year, Engineer Eduardo López Navarro submitted the Memoria Sobre el Plan General de Ferrocarriles en la Isla de Luzón which documents railway plans throughout the island of Luzon. Subsequently, in 1878, León Monssour formulated a five-line tramway system which included a loop within Intramuros, a line to Malate Church, another through Calle Azcarraga, through the community nearby San Sebastian Church aimed to serve locals from Sampaloc, and a line to Malacañang Palace.

Constructing the plans of León Monssour would not be realized without an entrepreneurial initiative. In 1882, the tramway company venture Compañia de los Tranvías de Filipinas was founded by Jacobo Zóbel y Zangroniz, engineer Luciano M. Bremon, and banker Adolfo Bayo in line with Manila's growing populace and demands for better land transit. At the same year, the plans of Monssour were reviewed. The Malacañang Line, thought to not meet projected demands, was replaced with plans for a line connecting Tondo and Malabón, later to be rebulit in the 1890s.

The tranvia lines were not opened at the same time; major construction for the lines took place between 1883 and 1886. The first tram line to be completed was the Tondo Line which was inaugurated on December 9, 1883. This was followed by the Intramuros Line in 1886; and then the Sampaloc Line the following year. The Sampaloc Line was named as such due to the nearby locality it services.

In 1888, the Malabón Line, the first steam railway of the Philippines (as well as the by the time the 3rd steam powered tramway in Southeast Asia after Jakarta's and Surabaya's in the Dutch East Indies, both in present day Indonesia), was completed, following the revised plans of Monssour. The line proved to be a commercial success, both by estimation and usage, with a greater profit than wheeled traffic. Aside from that, the ease of transporting goods from Malabon and the neighboring towns of Navotas and Caloocan to Manila hugely contributed to the line's success. It was also the only line with a double deck passenger railcar in service, the first and only time these appeared in the country.

Subsequently, in 1889, the Malate Line was opened to the public. Overall, the tramway provided a cheap, safe, and convenient means of transport within the city until the ouster of the Spanish regime by the US when tram services dwindled in maintenance and capacity.

=== Manila Streetcar System ===
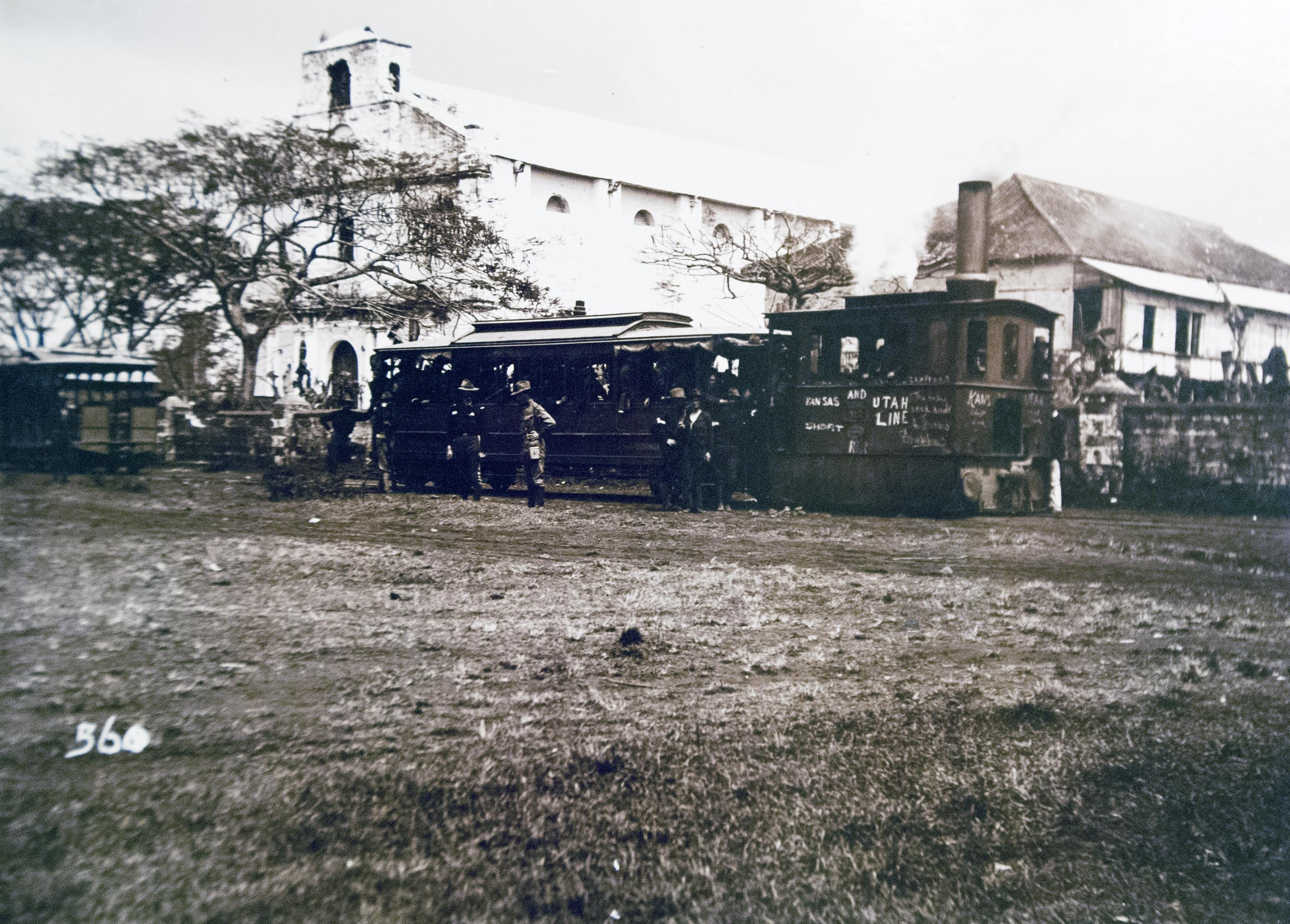
A steam tram at Caloocan with the markings "Kansas and Utah Short Line".

The United States established its governance in the Philippines in 1901. In the following year, a commission that called for franchise bids in operating a streetcar system alongside management of electricity was passed by five Americans and three Filipinos on October 20, 1902, known as Act No. 484. When Charles M. Swift won the bid for the Manila Electric Company franchise on March 24, 1903, he commissioned J. J. White for services in construction and engineering an electric tramway, and sometime in the following year, the Manila Electric Company acquired the Compañia de los Tranvías de Filipinas and the La Electricista. In 1905, the concession purchased both open and closed Type 2 Convertible streetcars from J. G. Brill Company to replace the German-built locomotives and bilevel cars of the early Tranvia.

In 1913, under Swift's other franchise of "Manila Suburban Railway", a 9.8 km (6.1 mi) extension line that ran from Paco to Fort Mckinley and Pasig began operation. This franchise merged with the Manila Electric, Rail, and Light Company in 1919, when it was then shortened to the familiar branding, Meralco. The tramway was then powered by a steam power plant in Isla Provisora.

On April 5, 1905, the tranvia was inaugurated. Although the terminology "streetcar" was favored by the American operators, locals still referred to the light railway as "tranvia".

After the events of World War II and the Battle of Manila, the tranvia was left to a state of beyond economical repair. The tracks has since been dismantled, the remaining fleet scrapped, and the transport system within the metro shifted to automobile dependence and jeepneys. Meralco has since been the sole electricity provider for Metro Manila and nearby provinces up to this date.

== Rolling stock ==
Throughout its existence, the tranvia utilized trams that differed mainly on propulsion. Under Spanish ownership, the tramway was noted for its horse-drawn coaches (tranvia de sangre), and under American rule, Meralco replaced the need for animal power by electrifying the tramways. All rolling stock ran on standard gauge light rail.

=== Steam-powered trams ===
Steam-powered trams ran exclusively through the Malabon Line. The first fleet in the whole tranvia system and by propulsion consisted of four German-made light rail locomotives and eight passenger coaches.

=== Horse-drawn carriages ===
Towards the end of the 19th century, Manila saw wheeled traffic powered by horses. As the popular power for land-based transport at that time, the secretary wrote that the Spanish tramway company was plagued with eccentric problems, mostly concerning the horses that pull the light rail coaches. Each tram can carry 12 seated and 8 standing passengers, resembling an omnibus. At least 10 vehicles were operated in 1902.

=== Electrified trams ===
American ownership of the tramway under Meralco paved way for electrification, as the company also specializes on electricity distribution. The company designs and produces its own rolling stock in its workshops, and the maximum fleet of electricity-powered streetcars reached a total of 170 in 1924. The streetcars utilize an overhead electrification system with a maximum of 500 volts.

Meralco also tinkered with trackless trolley buses, which subsequently replaced the streetcars plying Calle Santa Mesa between Rotonda and the San Juan Bridge.

== Operations ==
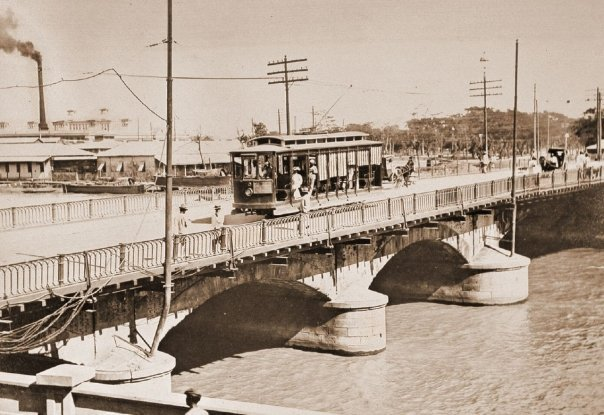
A tranvia along the Puente de España. The bridge was replaced by the Jones Bridge.

The tramway system began construction in 1885 as an enterprise of Don Jacobo Zobel, the Compañia de los Tranvías de Filipinas. The Malabon Line was first to be accomplished in 1888, utilizing eight passenger coaches and four German-manufactured steam locomotives. Full operations opened in 1889 with the addition of lines serving Intramuros, Malate, Sampaloc, and Malacañan within Manila. Unlike the Malabon Line, the trams that serviced within Manila are pulled by horses.

The tramway was an hourly service in each direction, owing to popular demand. At the Malabon Line, the earliest services begin 5:30 a.m. and end at 7:30 p.m. from Tondo; trips from Malabon were from 6:00 a.m. until 8:00 p.m., a schedule met every hour at mornings, and every half-hour beginning at 1:30 p.m.

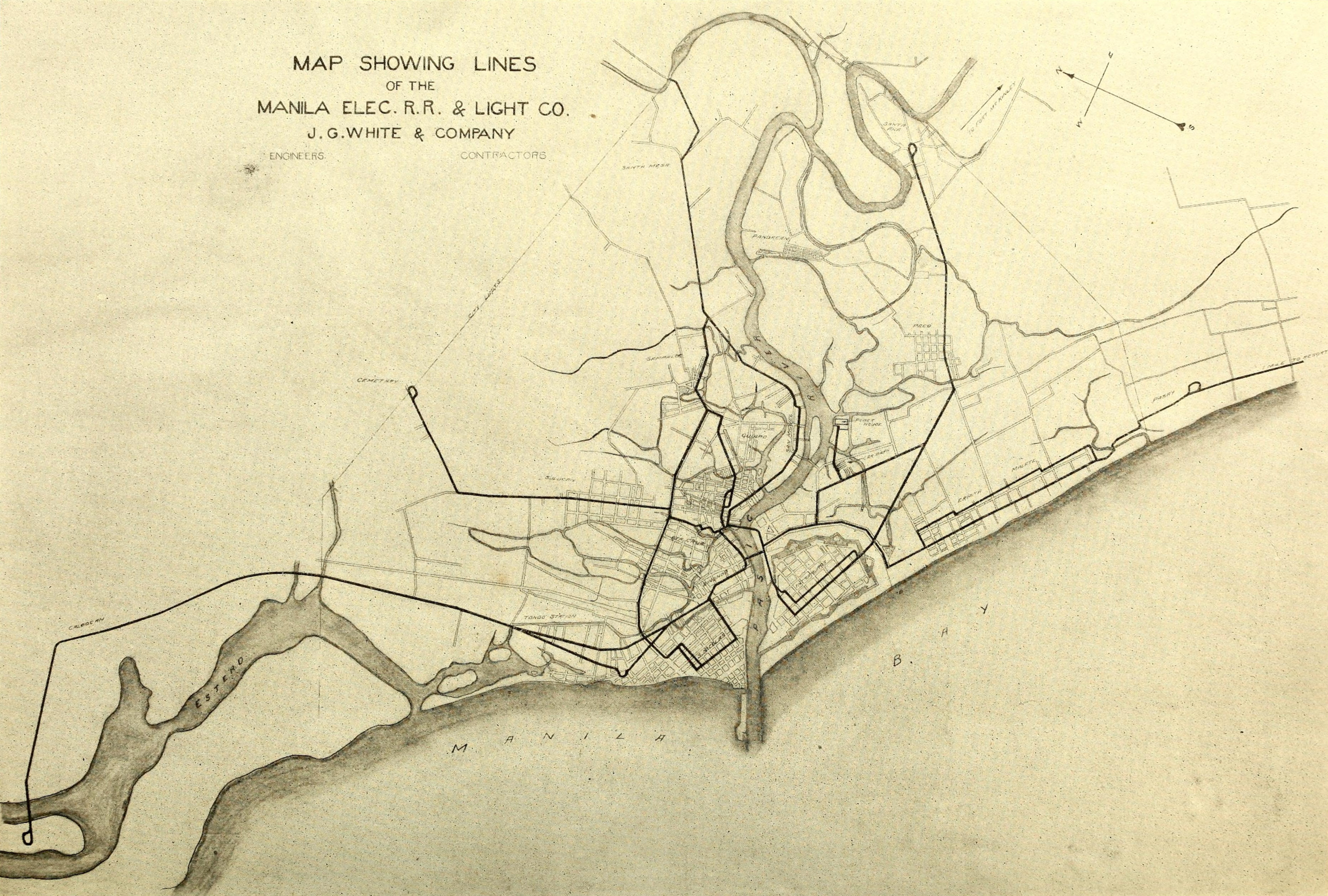
Map of the tranvia in 1905.

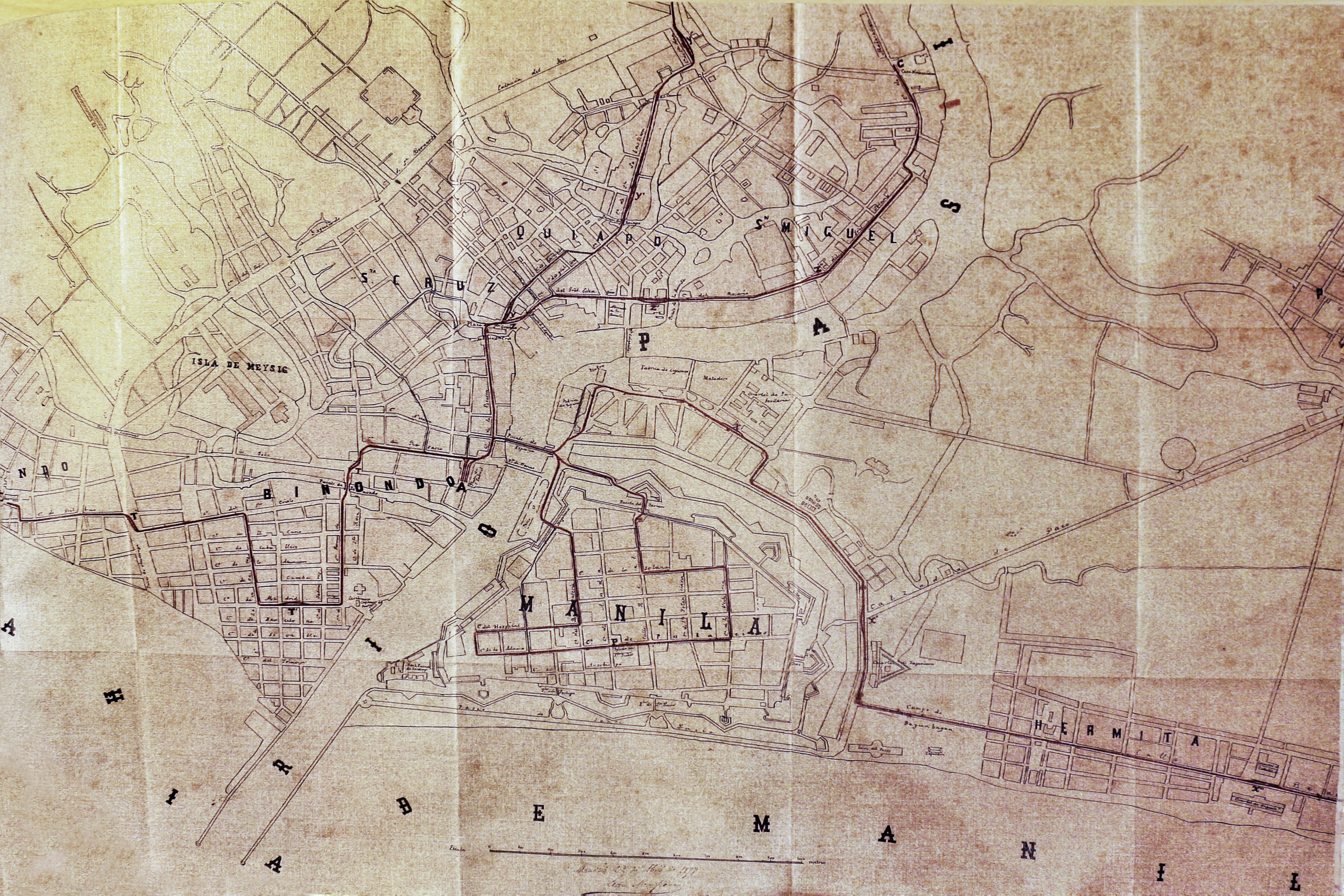
A map of the tranvia, as seen at Centro de Turismo Intramuros.

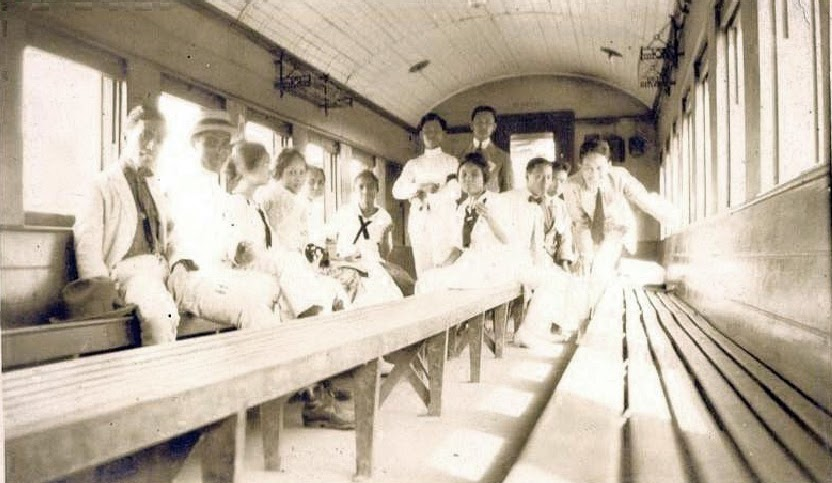
A rare picture of a tranvia interior

As the aftermath of the Filipino uprising and the American conquest, the tranvia was left in a poor state; in 1902, only ten horse-drawn cars service for a day. Thus, ownership was passed under the Manila Electric, Rail, and Light Authority as Charles Swift won the bid for the streetcar operation. By the end of the year 1905, the system was inaugurated under Meralco's handling, and had around 63 km (39 mi) of light rail track. The streetcar system at that time connected Binondo, Escolta, San Nicolas, Tondo, Caloocan, Malabon, Quiapo, Sampaloc, Santa Mesa, San Miguel, and other areas within Metro Manila. Under the American ownership, the light railroad workers are mostly Filipino.

The tramway system gained line extensions, such as a line that runs from Santa Ana to Pasig, adding 11.6 km (7.2 mi) of railway length. Larger streetcars of double-wheel trucks and closed sides are added to the fleet, complementing the demand. In 1920, a five-year reconstruction program was undertaken for the 15-year old tramway, where newer streetcars are designed and manufactured by the company workshops; by 1924, the fleet consists of around 170 cars.

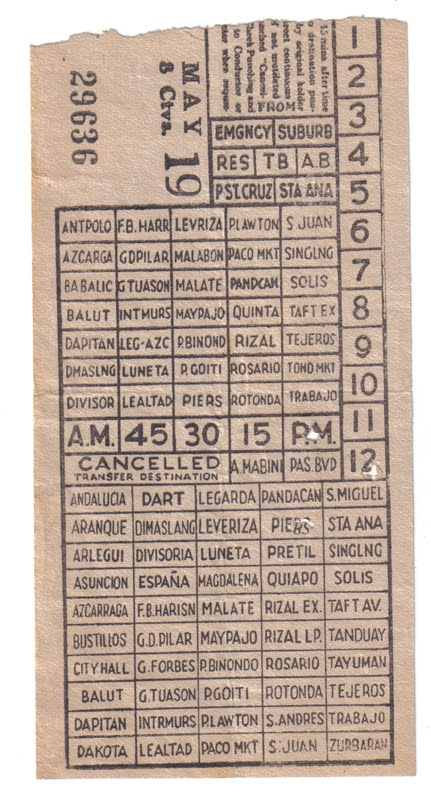
A ticket for a Tranvia ride

Complementing Meralco's transportation businesses, autobuses are added in services as a streetcar system expansion was deemed "not economically viable". In 1927, 20 autobuses were manufactured. When World War II began in 1941, the streetcar fleet was reduced from 170 to 109 as the bus fleet was expanded to 190. The war was the major setback for Meralco for its transportation business, causing poor maintenance alongside the 1943 floods, including the Battle of Manila which saw the extensive destruction of the city of Manila and consequently, the streetcar system.

=== Dismantlement ===
The streetcar system that once dominated Manila was destroyed during the Battle of Manila between Japanese and American Forces. Some of the remains of the tracks that used to be part of the tranvia system can be located at the intersection of Recto Avenue and Dagupan Extension near the old Tutuban Railway station. The tranvia system was quickly replaced with new modes of transportation such as buses and jeepneys after the Second World War.

== Incidents ==
The horse-drawn coaches and the signalling often resulted in confusion, mostly from the mishandling of the horses, the tram failing to stop, or that of the whistle used by the Guardia Civil tends to be taken as a signal which are replaced with trumpets.

Despite the tranvia's notable patronage, operations had been marred with issues such as occasional strikes by Meralco streetcar workers. A streetcar bombing incident once occurred while a strike was ongoing.

== Legacy ==
=== Intramuros tourist trolleys ===
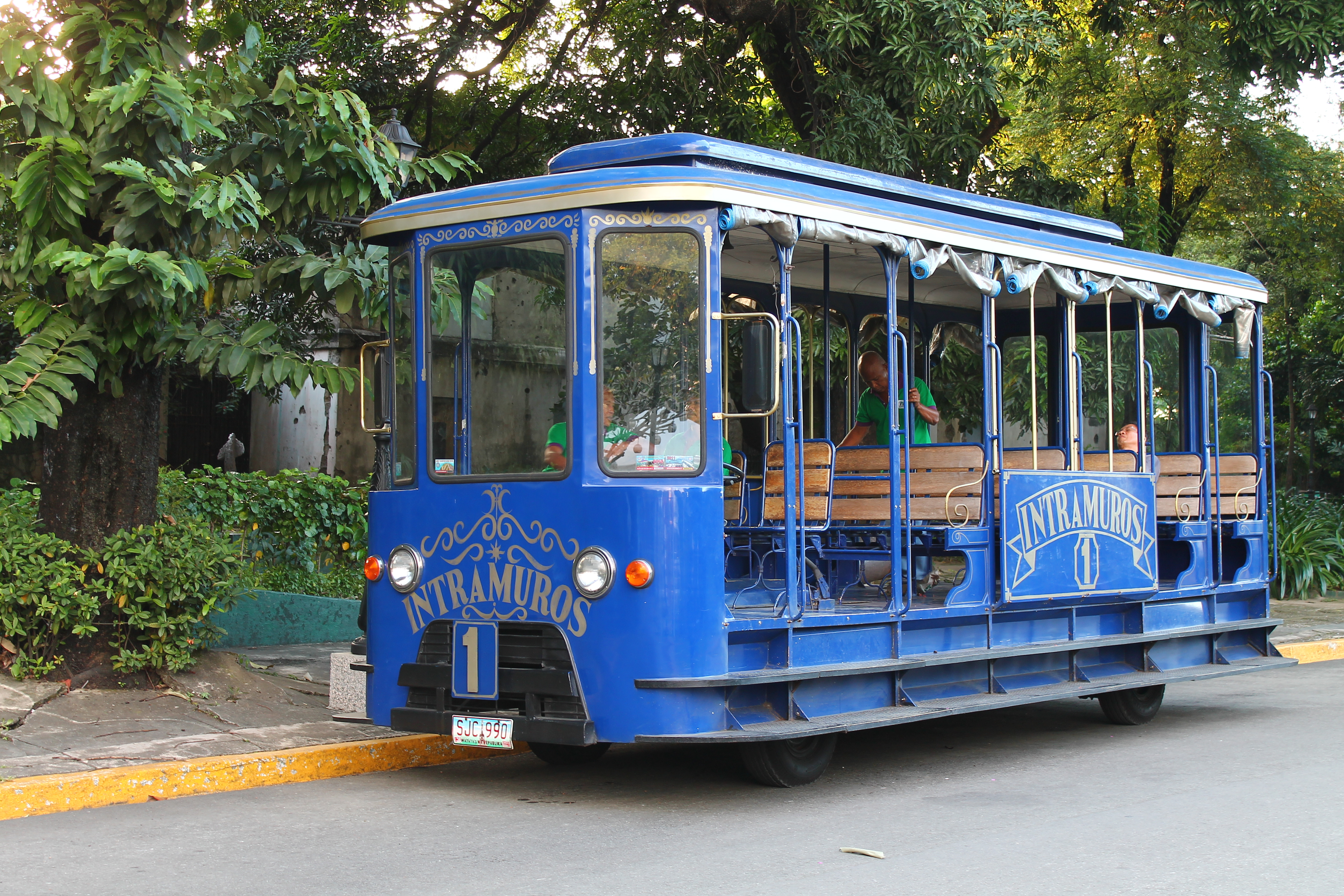
"Tranvia" in Intramuros, October 2012

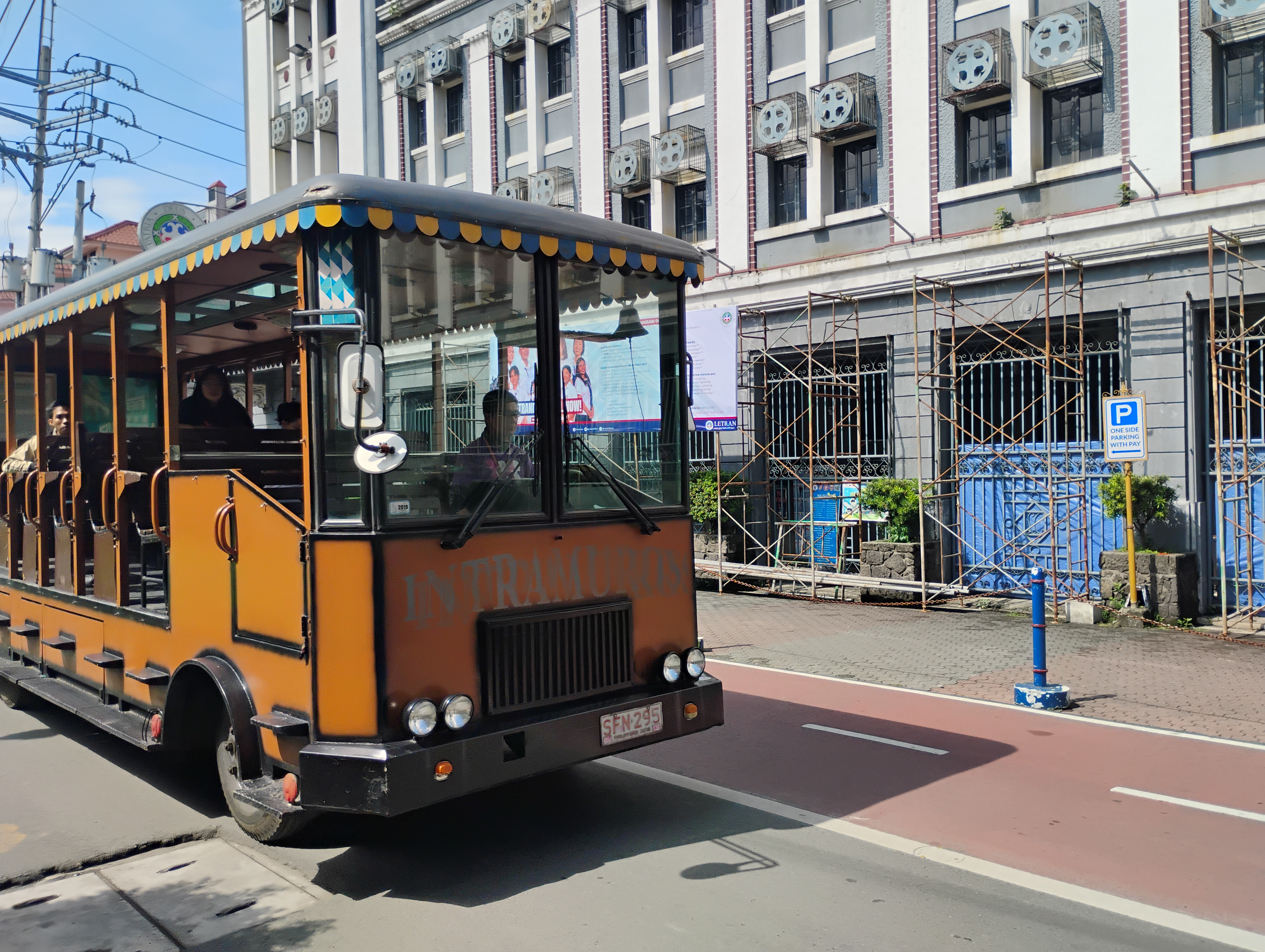
Another "Tranvia" in Intramuros, 2025.

The Intramuros Administration uses tourist trolleys that is meant to resemble the Tranvía. In 2026, they introduced an electric vehicle version billed as the "e-Tranvia".

=== Roxas Boulevard tram ===
There had been plans to revive the tranvia. In 2019, a consortium led by Greenergy Holdings Inc. aimed to invest an amount close to $500 million in building a tram system along 10 km (6.2 mi) of the service road on Roxas Boulevard. This follows a route plied by the original tramway during the early 1900s. Under a joint venture agreement, the arrangement projects the tramway to serve as a passenger feeder to the Makati Intra-city Subway project.

Presently, Meralco's former function as a railway operator echoes its legacy through its sister company MRail (formerly Miescorail), which has seen involvement in the maintenance, repair and rehabilitation works in LRT-1, MRT-3, and the Philippine National Railways.

=== Manila LRT ===
The contemporary LRT–1, constructed in 1980, has a right of way that closely follows the tranvia's right-of-way somewhere from Manila going south to Pasay.

== See also ==
- Meralco
- Philippine National Railways – the oldest extant railway system in the Philippines
- Corregidor – a fortified area within Cavite with a tramway system for military services
- Las Casas Filipinas de Acuzar – a heritage resort that features a short tram system alongside recreated bahay na bato structures in Bataan
- Line 1 – light rail successor of the tranvia system
- Jeepney – mode of transport that replaced the streetcar system after World War II
