= Centro de Turismo Intramuros =

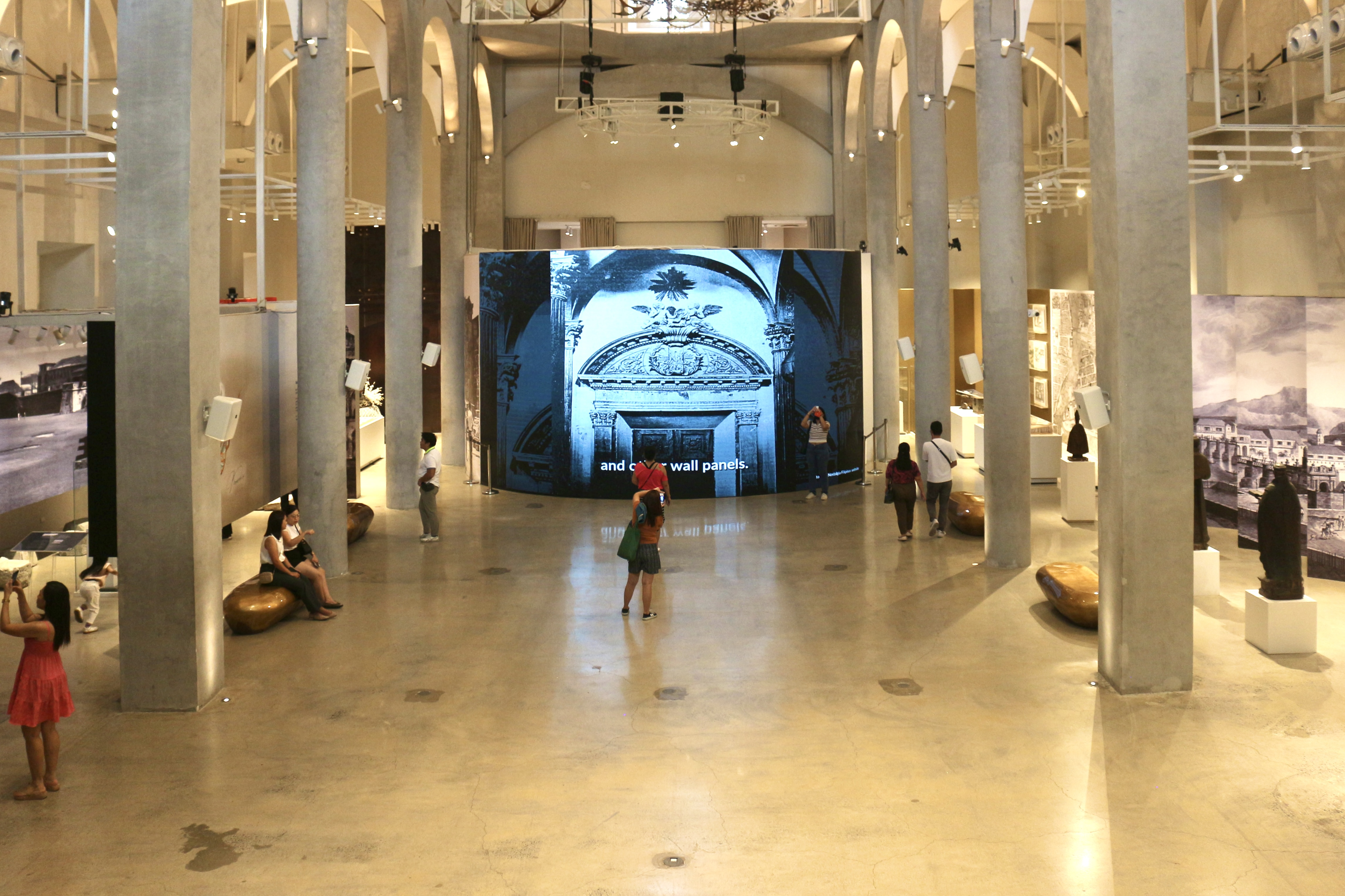
- The museum's interior in 2026
- Established: 12 September 2024
- Type: History and art museum
- Collection size: 8,000

The Centro de Turismo Intramuros, or simply Centro de Turismo, is a tourist hub and museum located inside the reconstructed San Ignacio Church along Arzobispo Street, Intramuros, Manila. It was launched on June 9, 2024 by the First Lady Liza Araneta Marcos, together with other government officials, and was officially opened to the public on June 12, 2024. It features 8,000 artifacts, mostly ecclesiastical collections from the adjacent Museo de Intramuros.
