= Kalesa =

Horse-drawn carriage in the Philippines

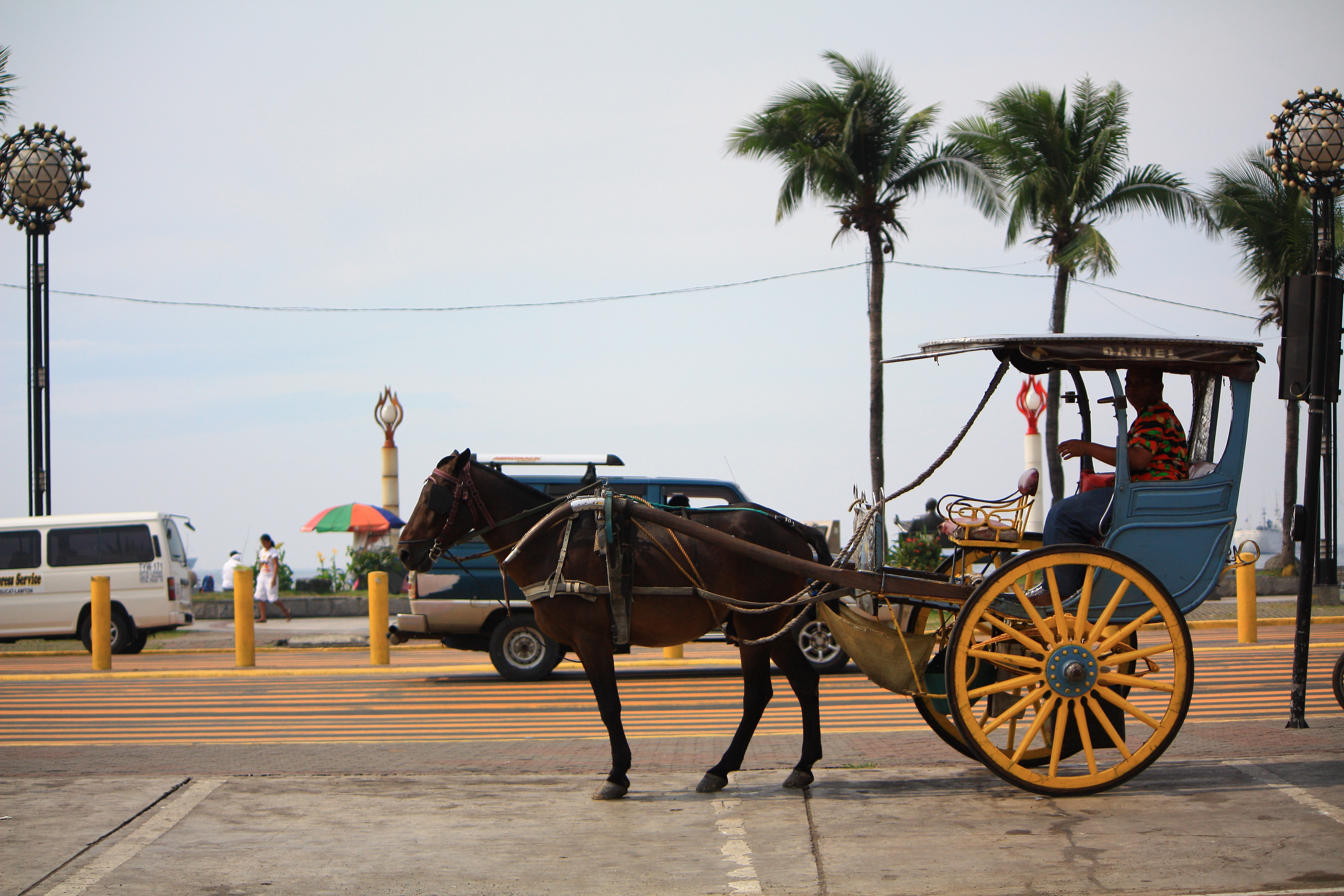
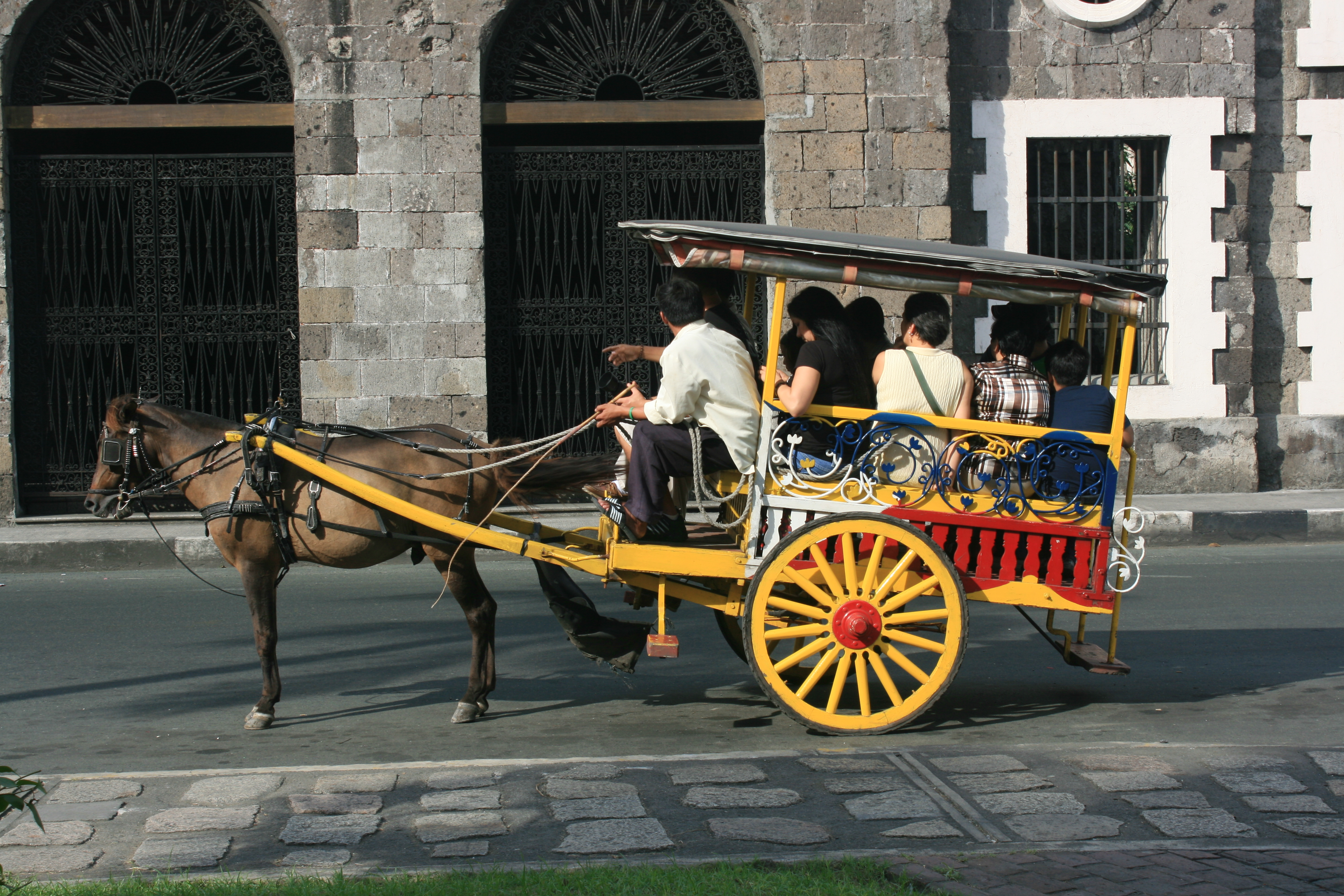
- A karomata-type (top) and a karitela-type (bottom)
- Application: Transportation
- Powered: No
- Self-propelled: No
- Wheels: 2

A kalesa (Philippine Spanish: calesa), is a two-wheeled horse-drawn carriage used in the Philippines. It is commonly vividly painted and decorated. It was the primary mode of public and private transport in the Philippines during the Spanish colonial and American colonial periods. Their use declined with the increasing use of motorized vehicles in the 20th century, until the kalesas stopped being viable in the 1980s. In modern times, they survive primarily as tourist attractions, such as in Vigan, Ilocos Sur.

== Description ==
The kalesa is a two-wheeled inclined cart drawn by a single horse. It is made from wood, metal, or a combination of both. The kalesa driver, known as the cochero (kutsero in Tagalog) or calesero (kalaseru in Ilocano), sits on the driver's seat called a pescante, located directly in front of the passenger's seats. Both the driver and the passengers are covered by a canopy made from fabric or leather to provide protection from the sun and rain.

Kalesa types are differentiated by their size and purpose, though the terms have become interchangeable over time.

- The karomata (also spelled karumata; from Spanish carromata) is small, carrying one or two passengers in front-facing seats and is entered from the sides. Historically, these had the barest of conveniences and charged the lowest rates, which led to them being characterized as the "commoner's carriage".
- The karitela (also spelled karetela, from Spanish carretela) is a larger kalesa that carries freight or up to six passengers in face-to-face seating and is entered from the rear (similar to jeepneys). They were widely used by small businesses for cheap cargo transport. In Cebu, karitelas are known as tartanilla and seat eight to ten people.
- The karwahe (from Spanish carruaje) is a large four-wheeled versions of the kalesa.
- Garetas or kareton (from Spanish carretón) are drays used to transport cargo, and are usually drawn by carabao (a type of water buffalo).
Types of kalesas

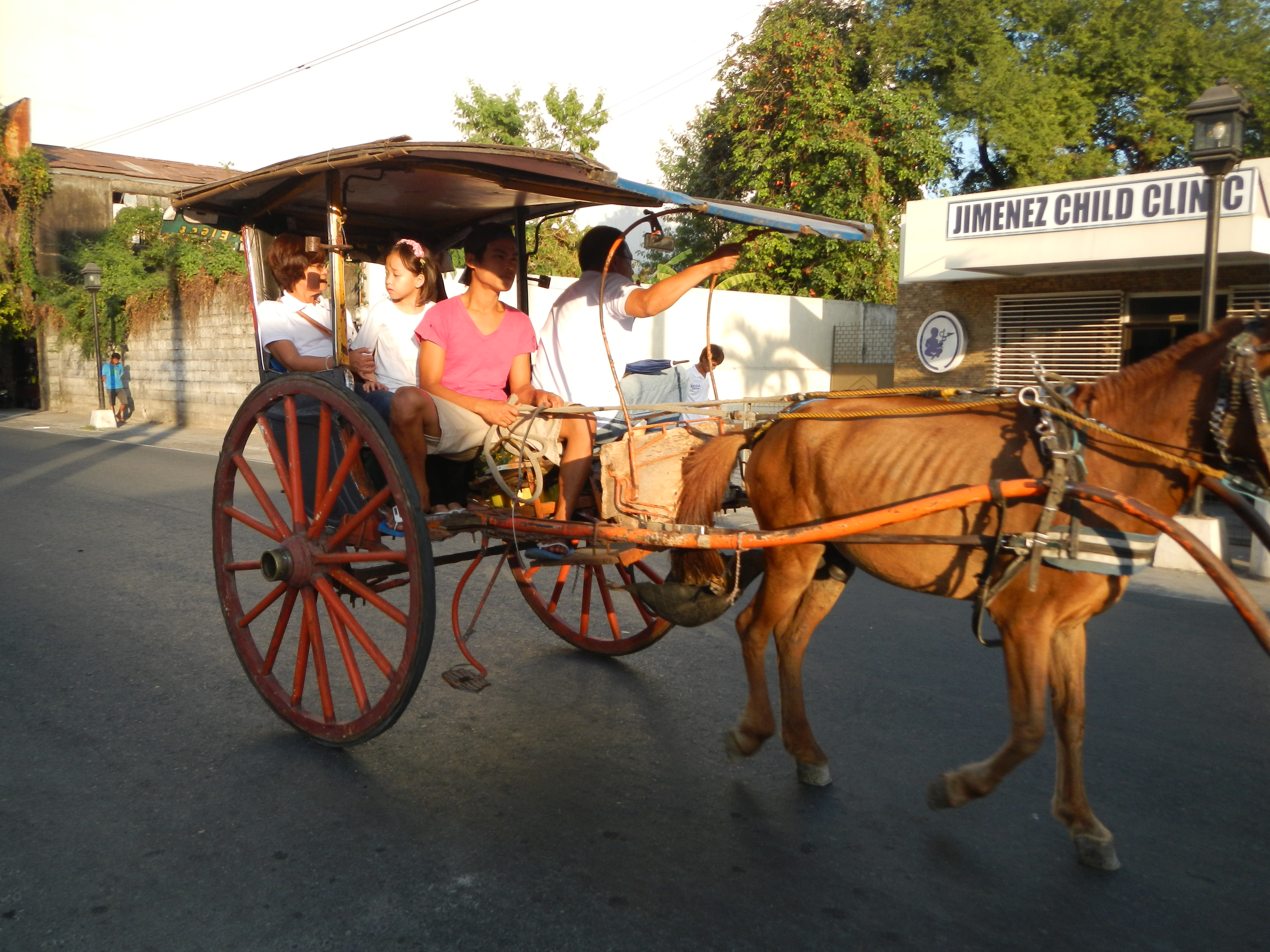
Karomata

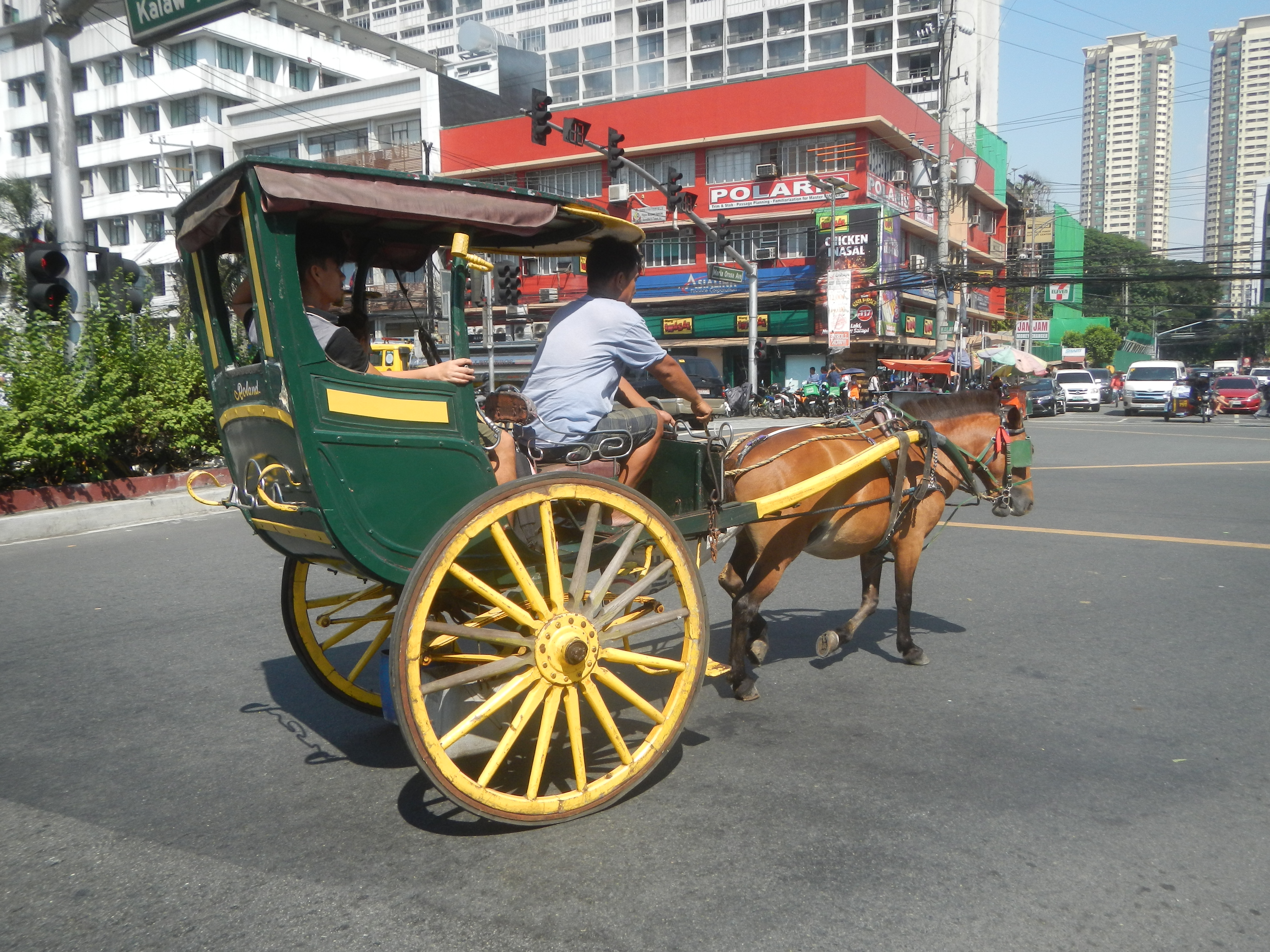
Karomata

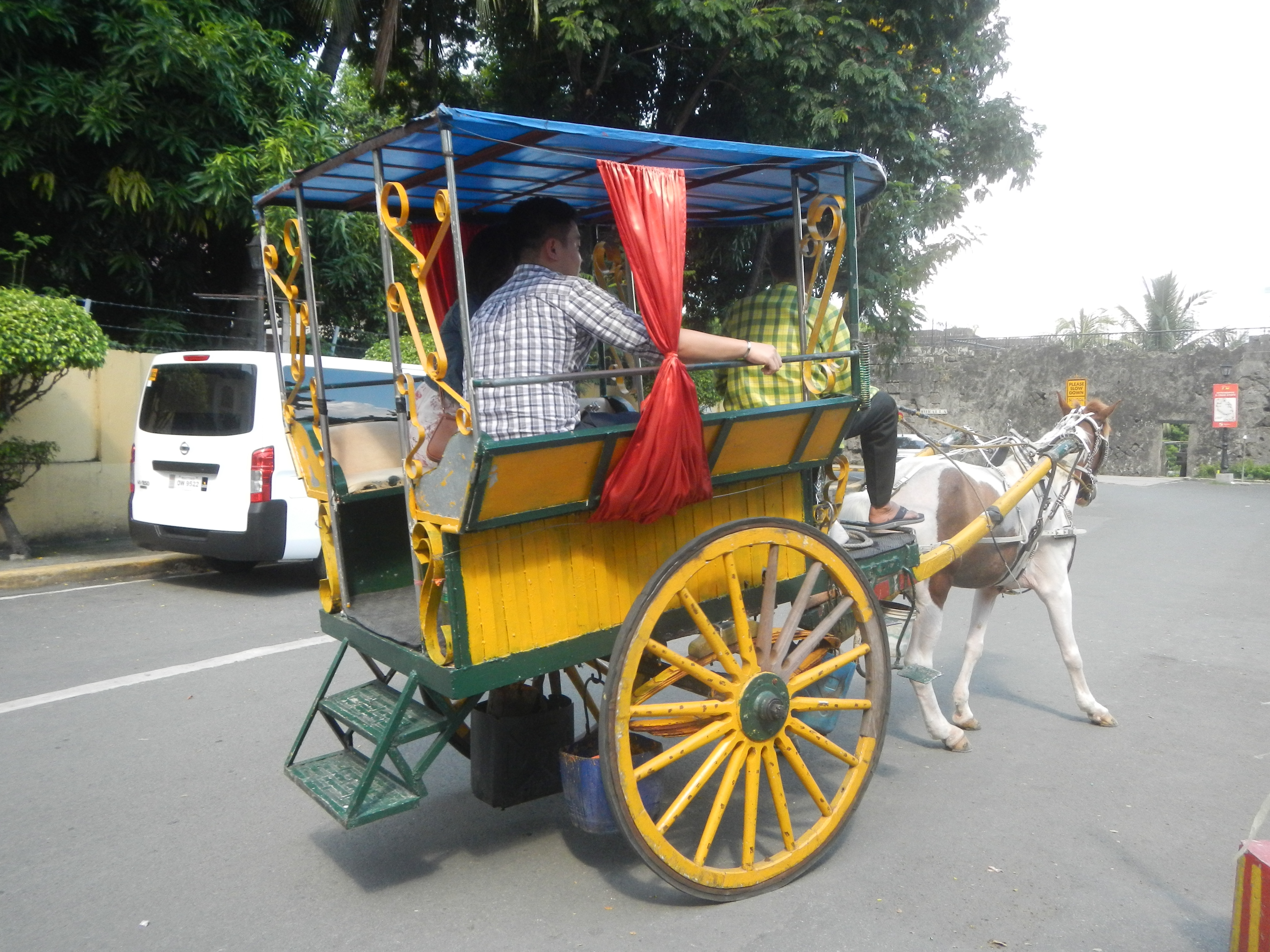
Karitela

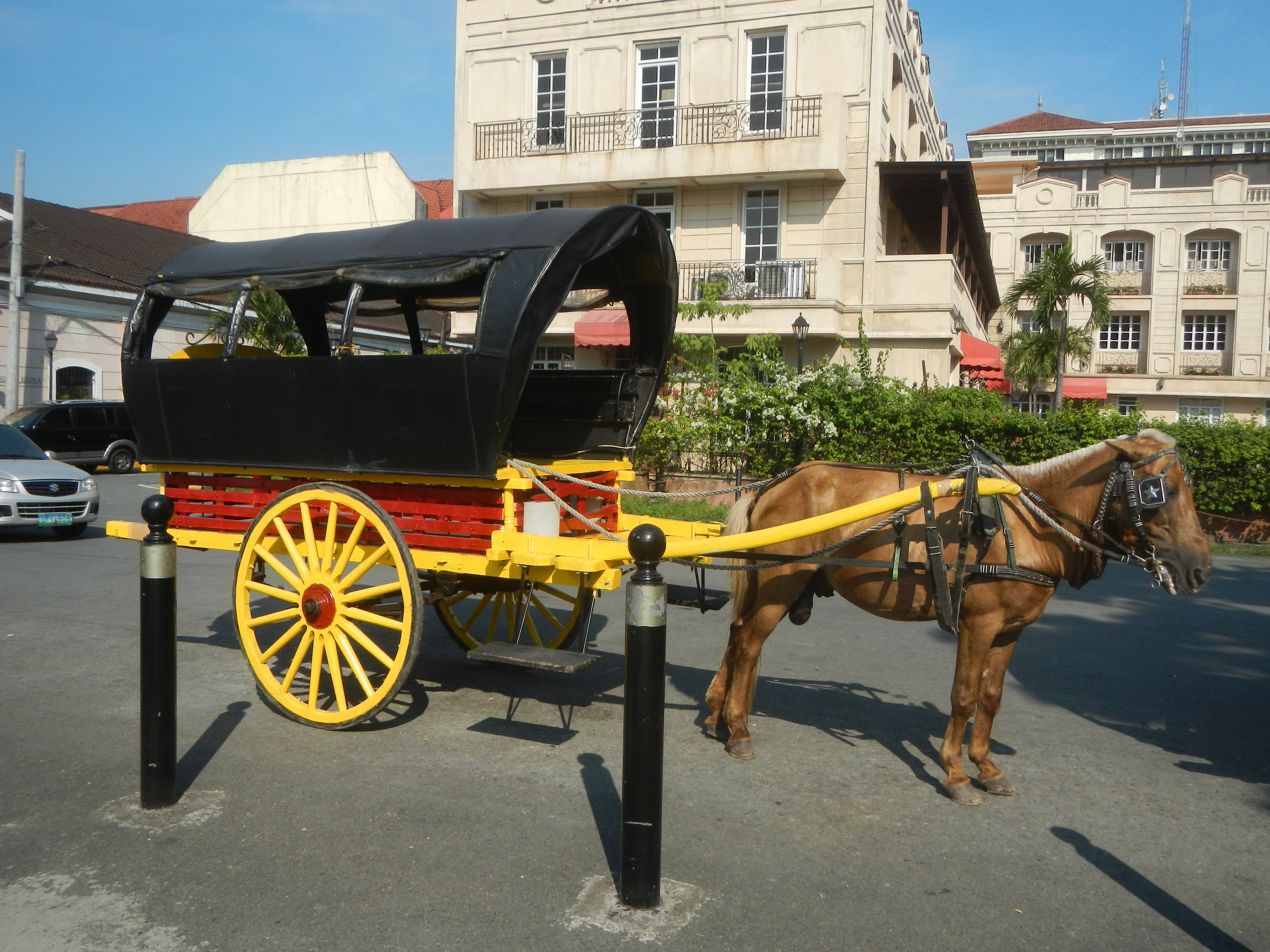
Karitela

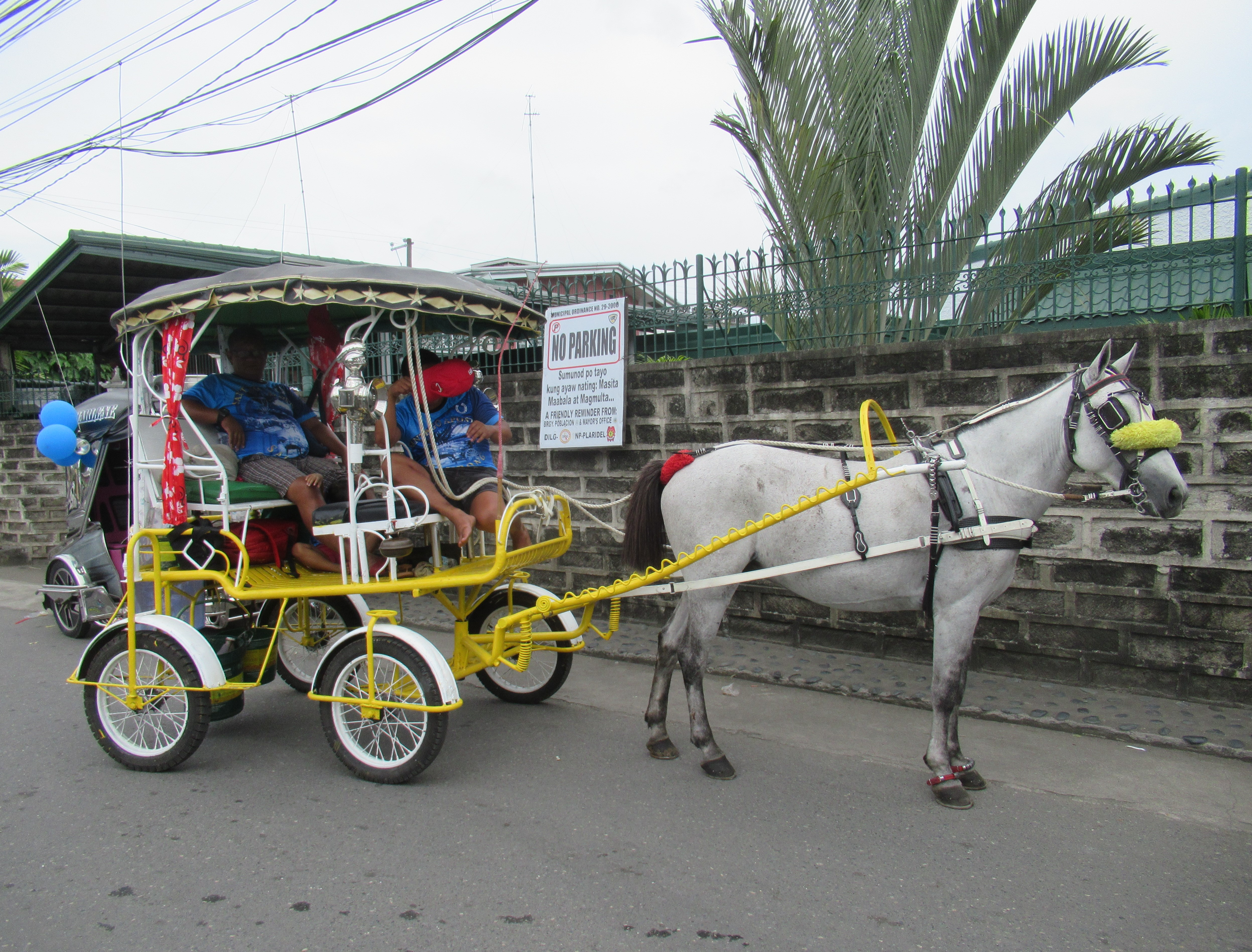
Karwahe

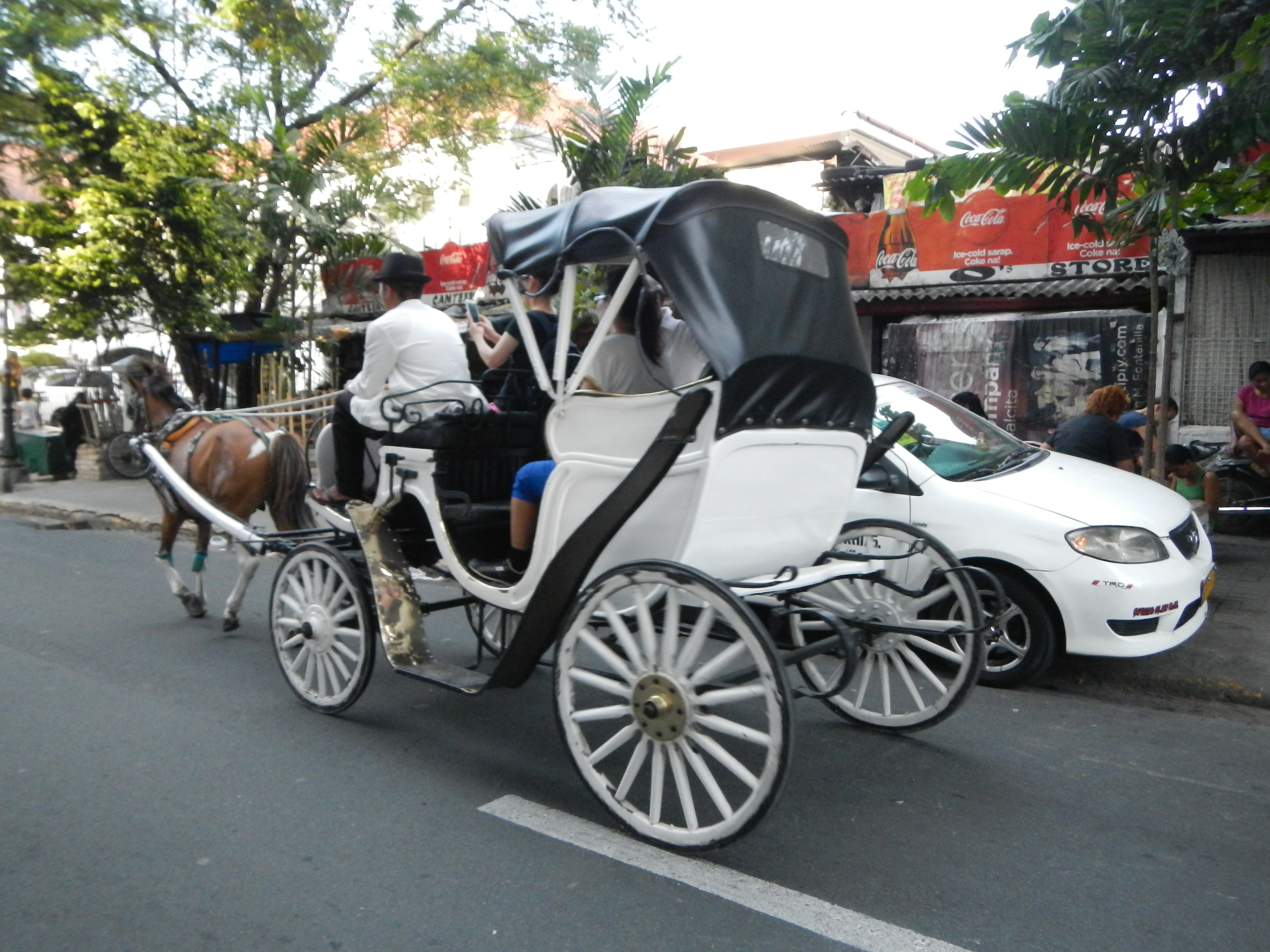
Karwahe

Kalesas can be either public for-hire vehicles or private vehicles. Kalesas originally drove on the left side of the road (in contrast to modern vehicular traffic in the Philippines, which drive on the right). They communicated with other drivers through hand signals.

Kalesa drivers had a specific vocabulary of verbal commands for their horses. The command for turning right is "[de] mano" ("[to the] hand", referring to the hand holding the reins). While the command to turn left is "silla" ("[to the] chair"; referring to the seat beside the cochero where the left hand of the cochero usually rests). Additional commands include "derecho" ("straight ahead"), "avante" ("go forward"), "sigue" ("go ahead"), "atras" ("go backward"), "vuelta" ("turn around", to make a U-turn), "arrancada" ("speed up"), "menor" ("slow down"), "carga silla" ("stop on the left"), and "carga de mano" ("stop on the right"). Kalesa drivers can command horses to move at different speeds: trotando (trot), galope (full gallop), and escape (rush).

== History ==
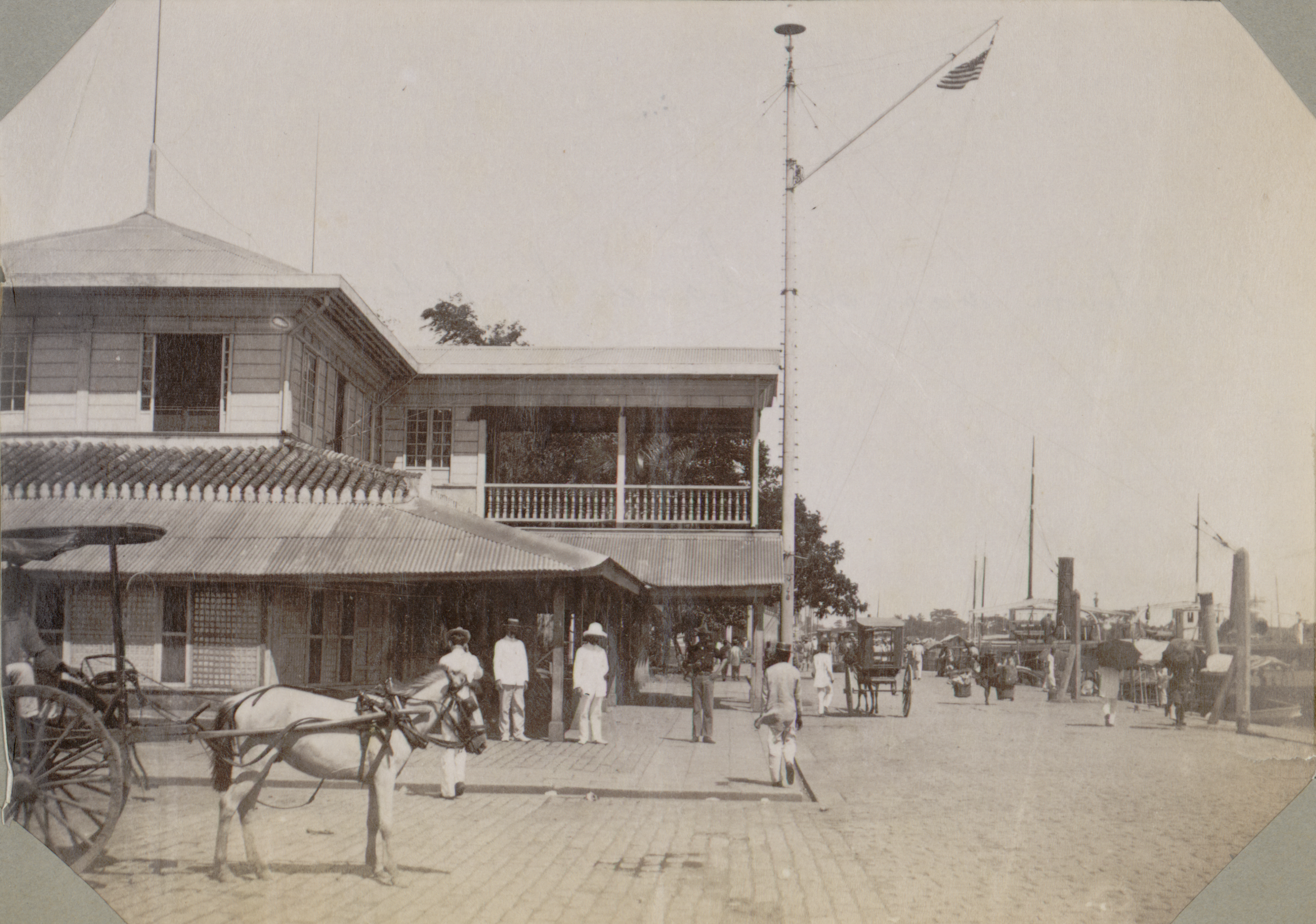
Kalesas in a street in Manila, circa pre-1900

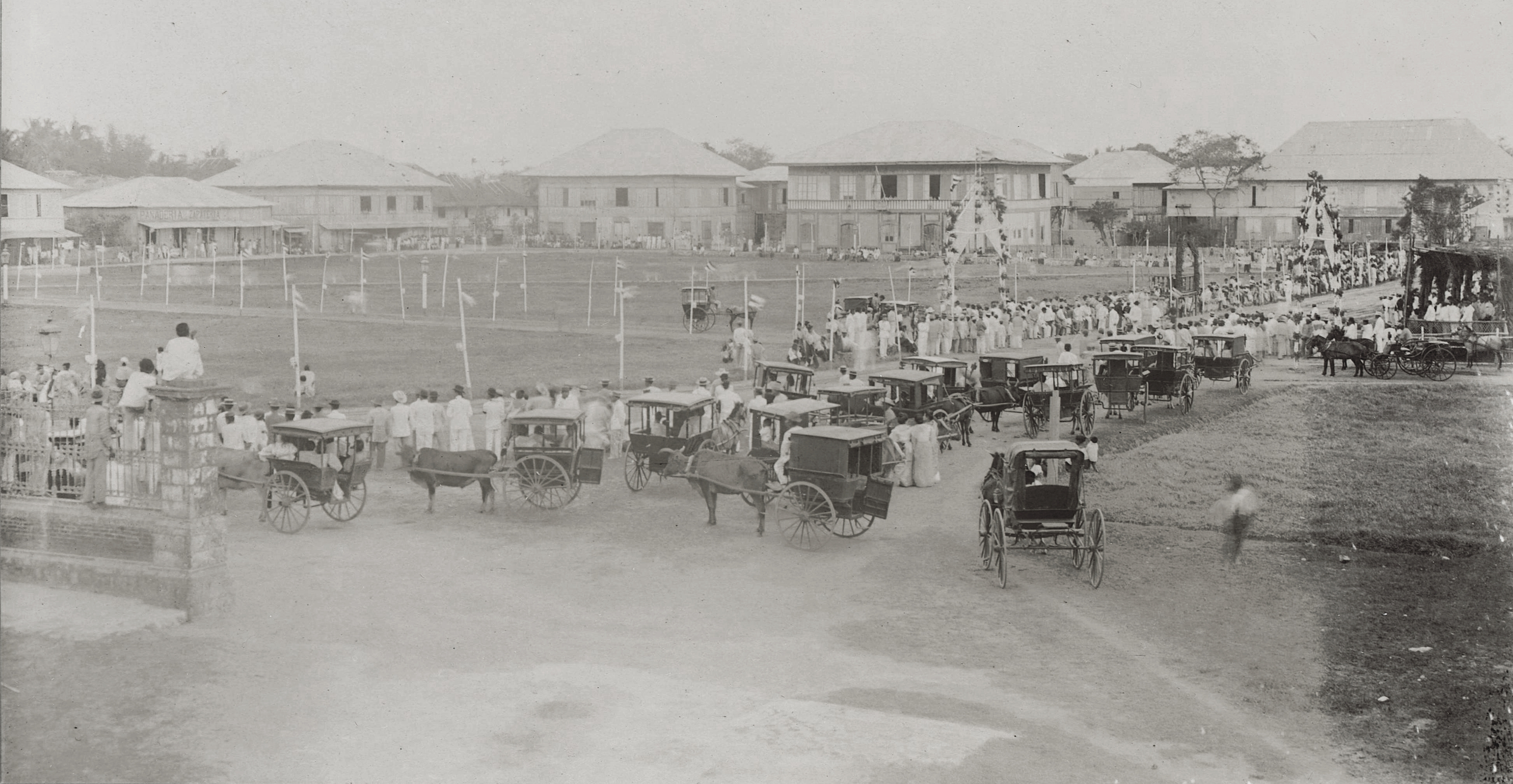
Kalesas during "bicycle races" in the Bacolod public plaza in 1901

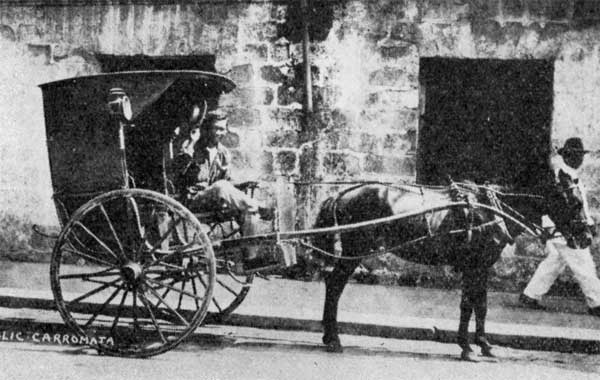
A karomata in Manila (c. 1923)

Kalesa, named from the Spanish calesa, were first introduced to the Philippines in the 1700s by the Spanish. They became the primary mode of public and private transportation in the islands. They were manufactured by traditional workshops known as karoserya. The fodder used to feed the horses were known as zacate, the production of which was also its own significant industry due to the prevalence of kalesas.

Use of the kalesa continued during the American colonial period of the Philippines (1898 to 1946), where they remained the main form of cheap public transport. The American colonial government attempted to introduce rickshaws in 1902 to augment public transport in Manila, but it never gained acceptance due to resistance from unionized kalesa drivers—who characterized rickshaws as "making beasts of human beings".

The American colonial government also started motorizating public transport in the early 20th century, introducing automobiles like jeepneys ("auto calesas") and buses ("autobuses") and expanding the Tranvía electric tram lines. These new motorized vehicles competed directly with the kalesas, causing conflict between the motorized and horse-drawn sectors. New ordinances were created that restricted the movement of horse-drawn vehicles in favor of motorized transport. Despite this, the kalesas flourished well into the mid-20th century, due to their much more flexible routes, their cheapness, and the significant political power of the kalesa driver trade unions. The political weight of the kalesa driver unions was referred to in contemporary media as the "calesa vote" and was regarded as synonymous to the voting power of the lower classes. It included the low-income working class and small businesses who relied on kalesas for both personal transport and delivery of goods. The "calesa vote" had a strong influence in elections, allowing kalesas to avoid most attempts at changing traffic regulations. In the late 1930s, there were still an estimated 7000 kalesas operating in Manila alone.

In 1939, the government proposed measures in a series of public hearings to abolish the kalesas to solve the worsening traffic problems they caused. The strongest proposal to emerge was the immediate buyout of the kalesa drivers, with the possibility of retraining them as automobile drivers. This was met with mass protests from the kalesa driver unions which led to the abandonment of these proposals. However, an increasing number of other measures were taken, including a ban on the creation of new kalesa terminals and bans on kalesas from entering certain busy streets or parking near markets.

During World War II, from 1941 to 1945, kalesas continued to provide much-needed services during the Japanese occupation of the Philippines. They were also still in use in the postwar years, but they were already in decline and had lost their previous political clout. More restrictions were introduced in the 1960s, such as limiting them to side roads. A few kalesas survived up until the late 1980s before becoming effectively nonviable as a form of public transport in Metro Manila. There were a few kalesas still in use as short-haul public transport around Binondo, Manila, in the 1990s to the 2000s; but they too were replaced by the 2010s with pedicabs, kuliligs, motorized tricycles, and electric tricycles (electric rickshaw and mobility scooters).

== Modern usage ==
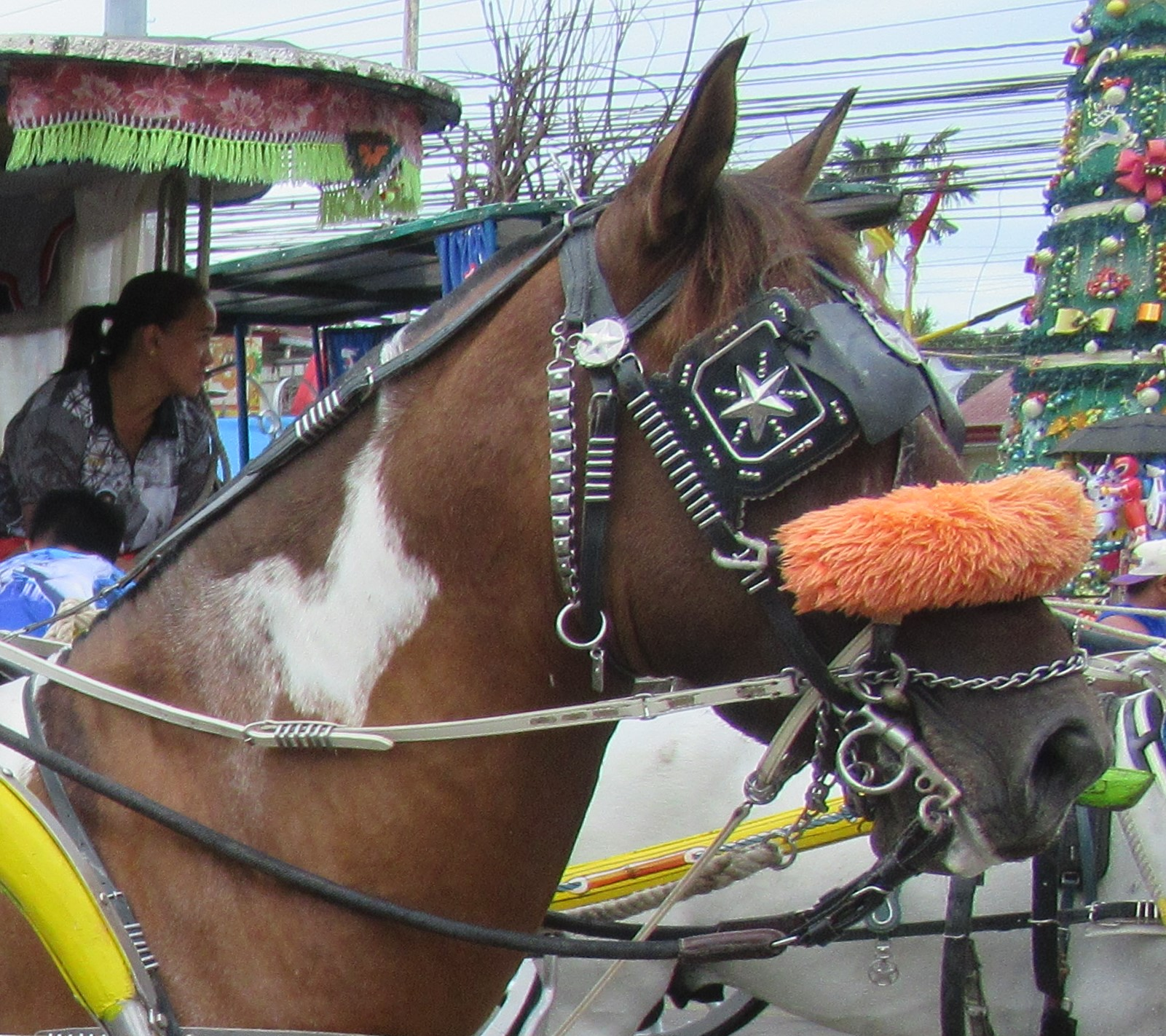
In addition to wearing typical horse harness equipment such as blinkers (tapaojo), this kalesa horse is fitted with a shadow roll and homemade visor, effectively blindfolding it.

The kalesa in modern times are largely only used as tourist attractions. Tourist kalesas are common in historical colonial-era sites in the Philippines, such as in San Fernando, Vigan and Laoag. Kalesas can also be found in Intramuros, where they cater to tourists and Binondo in Manila, as well as in Iligan, where decorated kalesas can be taken for a ride along a specific street.

Kalesas still being used as public transport survive in only a few areas of the Philippines. In Cebu, karitela-type kalesas, locally known as tartanillas, are still in operation, though they are gradually fading out. Kalesas are also still common as public transport in Cagayan, especially in Tuao, Tuguegarao, and other municipalities of the province.

An annual "Kalesa Parade" is held during the Binatbatan Festival of the Arts of Vigan. In Tuguegarao, a "Kalesa Spectacle" is included in the annual Pavvurulan Afi Festival. An annual kalesa festival known as "Kalesa, Kabayu, Kalaseru" is also celebrated in Cabagan, Isabela.

== Cultural influence ==
Two modern motorized public transport vehicles in the Philippines are named after the kalesa: the jeepney, which was originally known as the "auto calesa" (or "AC" for short) from the 1910s to the 1940s; and the motorela of Northern Mindanao, a portmanteau of "motorized" and "carretela".

Post-World War II jeepneys borrowed their colorful decorative style from the kalesa, and the horse hood ornament of most jeepneys is a tribute to its kalesa predecessor.

The Tagalog idiom "kuwentong-kutsero" (lit. "coachman's story"; meaning "gossip", "false or exaggerated rumor", or a tall tale) is derived from the habit of cocheros (kalesa drivers) exchanging stories and rumors for entertainment while waiting for passengers.

Composer Ambrosio Del Rosario composed the original music and Levi Celério wrote the lyrics for a song entitled Kalesa, in honor of the vehicle.

== See also ==
- Kangga, a traditional Carabao-drawn sled
