= San Francisco Church (Manila) =

Former Roman Catholic church in Manila, Philippines

- San Francisco Church of Intramuros; Iglesia de San Francisco de Intramuros (Spanish)
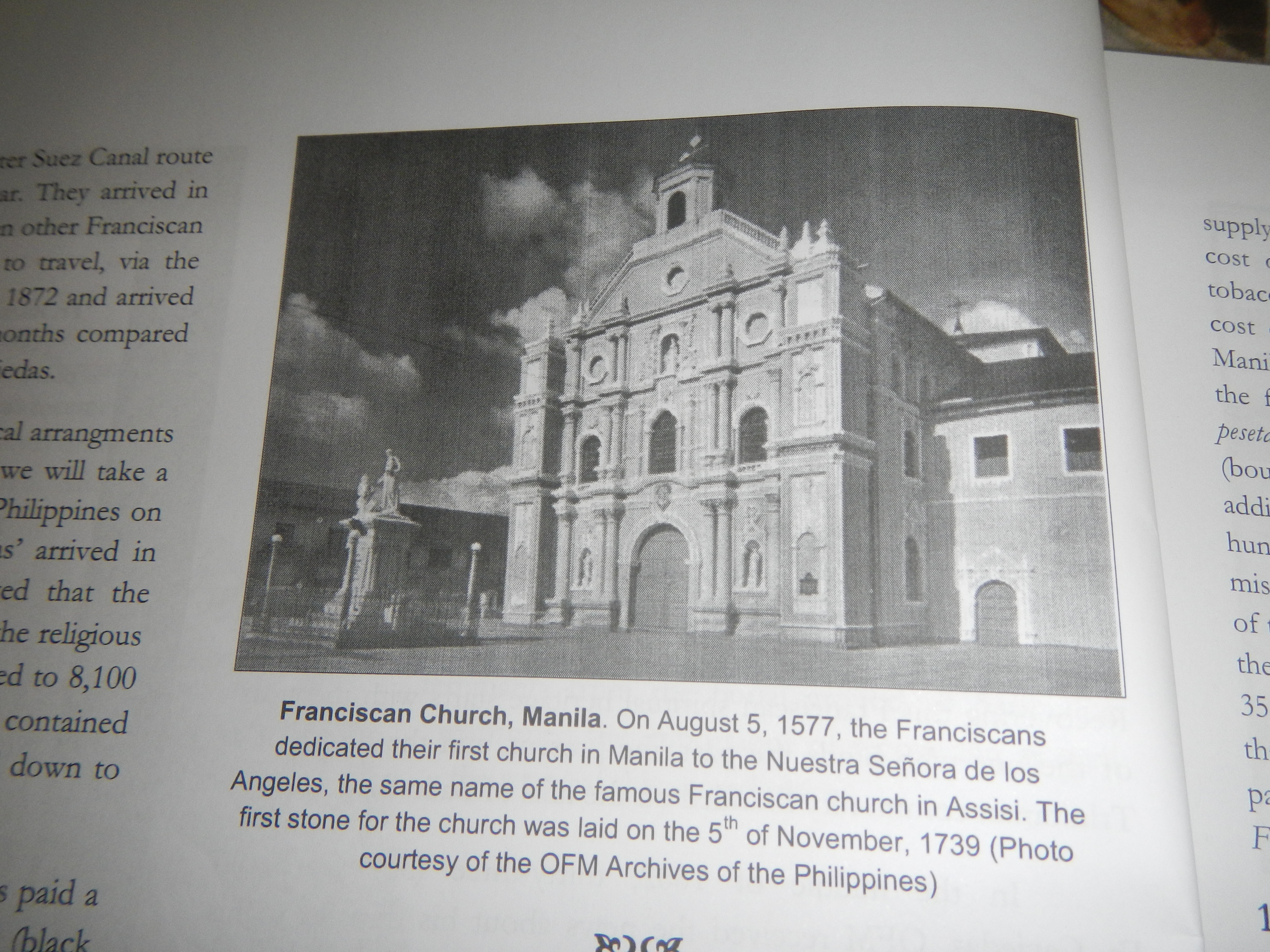
- San Francisco Church facade in a newspaper
- San Francisco Church
- 14°35′28″N 120°58′42″E
- Location: San Francisco and Solana Streets, Intramuros, Manila
- Country: Philippines
- Denomination: Roman Catholic

History
- Status: Inexistent
- Dedication: Our Lady of Angels

Architecture
- Architectural type: Church building
- Demolished: 1945

San Francisco Church was a Roman Catholic church along San Francisco and Solana Streets in the walled city of Intramuros, Manila, Philippines. The church, which used to be the center of the Franciscan missions in the Philippines, was destroyed during the Second World War. The site has been occupied by Mapúa University since the war.

== History ==
When the Franciscans arrived in the Philippines in 1578, they built a church made of nipa, bamboo and wood, which was inaugurated on August 2 and was dedicated to the Our Lady of Angels. On November 5, 1739, the cornerstone of a new stone church was laid. It was destroyed in the Allied bombardment of Manila during the Second World War. The statue of Saint Anthony of Padua in the courtyard of Santuario de San Antonio in Forbes Park, Makati, was the lone survivor of the ravages of the war. After World War II, the site was sold to, and has been occupied by the Mapúa University.

== See also ==
- San Ignacio Church of Intramuros

== Bibliography ==
- Bryan, William; Olivares, José de (1899). Our Islands Their People Seen Camera Pencil. New York: N. D. Thompson Publishing. p. 636.
