= San Ignacio Church (Manila) =

Roman Catholic church ruins in Intramuros, Manila

- Simbahan ng San Ignacio (Filipino); Iglesia de San Ignacio (Spanish)
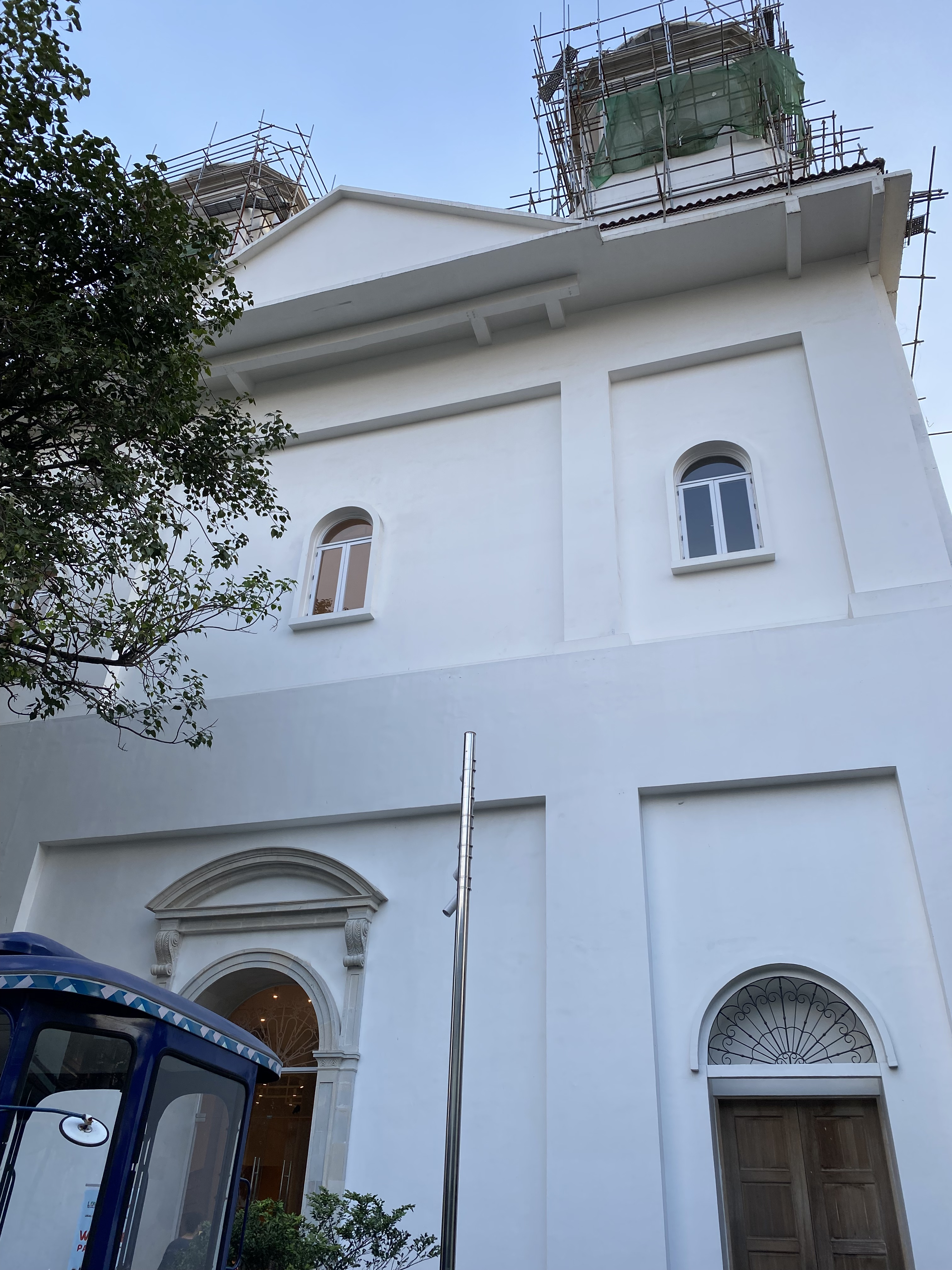

- Location in Metro Manila Location in Luzon Location in the Philippines
- 14°35′23″N 120°58′24″E
- Location: Manila, Intramuros
- Country: Philippines
- Denomination: Roman Catholic

History
- Status: former Parish church
- Dedication: Saint Ignatius of Loyola

Architecture
- Functional status: Open
- Architect: Félix Roxas Sr.
- Architectural type: Parish
- Style: Neoclassical
- Completed: 1899
- Demolished: February 1945

San Ignacio Church is a historic building located in Intramuros, Manila, Philippines. It was designed for the Jesuits by Filipino architect Félix Roxas Sr., and the building was completed in 1899. Its interiors, embellished with carvings, had been designed by Isabelo Tampinco. The church was known as the "sueño dorado" or the "golden dream" by the Jesuits. It was destroyed during the Battle of Manila in 1945 near the end of World War II, with only its shell remaining. The church building was reconstructed in the late 2000s without the original ornaments, along with its adjoining Casa Misión Convent. It eventually became the home of the Centro de Turismo Intramuros, while the mission house became the site of the Museo de Intramuros.

== History ==
The Jesuits built two churches in honor of St. Ignatius of Loyola at two different sites. The first site was located along Calle Real del Palacio, at the present site of Pamantasan ng Lungsod ng Maynila (former site of Colegio de Manila). The second site was located along Calle Arzobispo, beside the guesthouse of the Archdiocese of Manila and the archdiocesan chancery and archives – formerly the Arzobispado or the Episcopal Palace, the residence and office of the archbishop of Manila.

=== First church ===
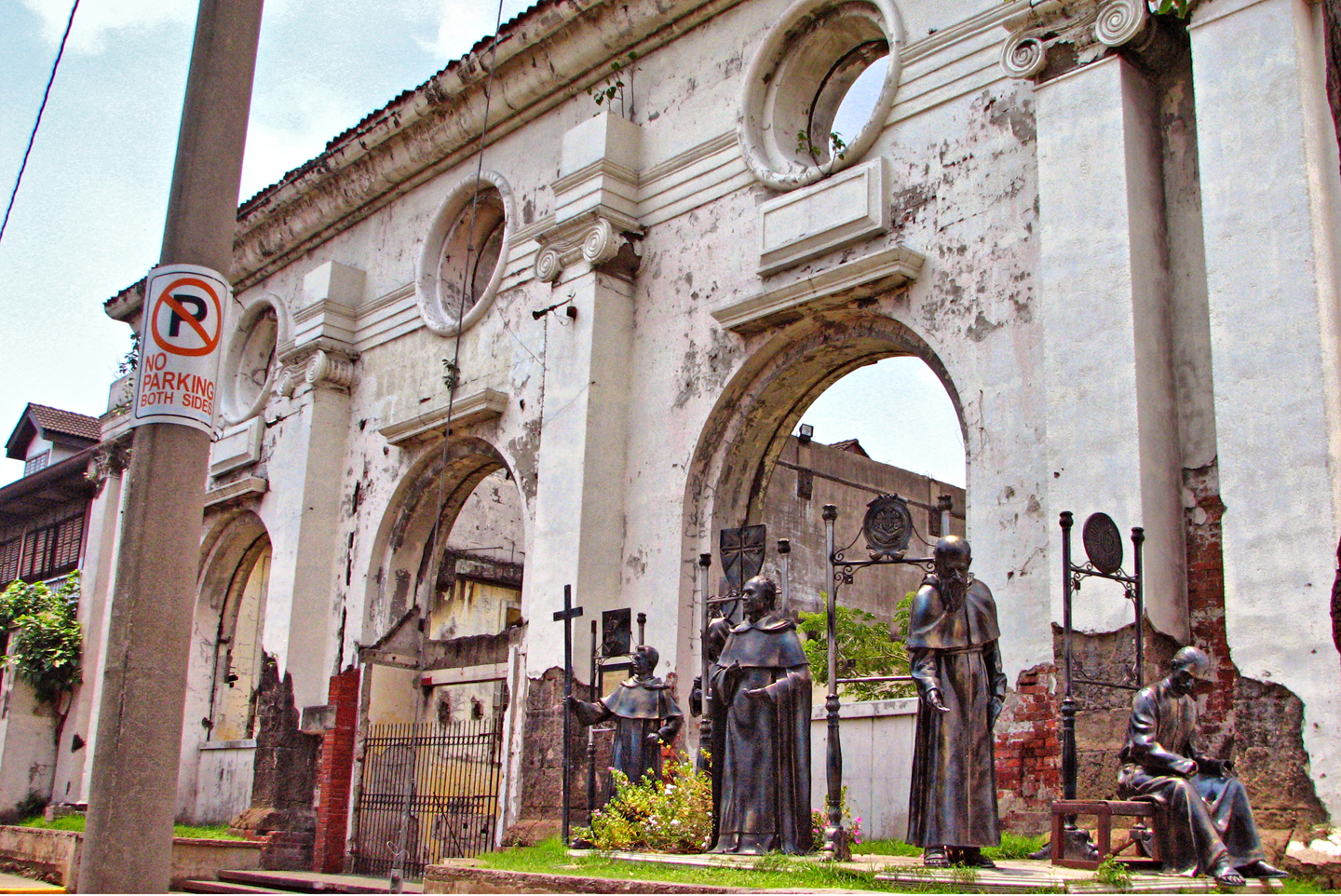
Ruins of San Ignacio Church showing its rear elevation

There were three churches built at the site of the former Colegio de Manila (currently Pamantasan ng Lungsod ng Maynila) between 1587 and 1879. The first church, designed by Italian Jesuit priest-architect Gianantonio Campioni, was constructed in 1587 and dedicated to St. Ignatius of Loyola. The funds for the construction came from oidor Don Gabriel de Ribera. It was made of wood with a tile roof and was completed in 1632.

The second church, made of stone, was constructed from 1590 to 1596 following the plans of Antonio Sedeño and was dedicated to Saint Anne, the mother of the Virgin Mary. It was damaged by an earthquake in 1600.

In 1626, the third church was constructed and dedicated again to St. Ignatius of Loyola. The church was completed in 1632. Due to the expulsion of the Jesuits from the Philippines, the church slowly deteriorated from 1768 to 1784. The Seminario de San Carlos managed the church and the adjacent Colegio de Manila in 1784. On September 6, 1852, an earthquake caused major damage to the façade of the church; the flanking bell towers and the lower floor of the nave were the only structures left standing. The site later became a military barracks known as Cuartel de España, which served as the headquarters of the 31st American Infantry Regiment.

=== Second church ===
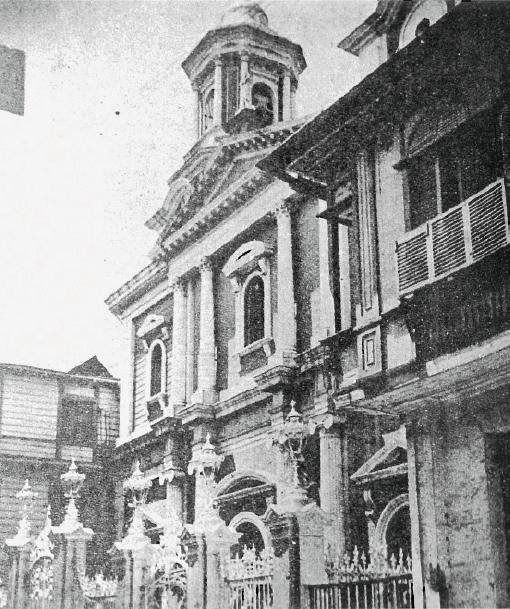
Facade of the second San Ignacio Church

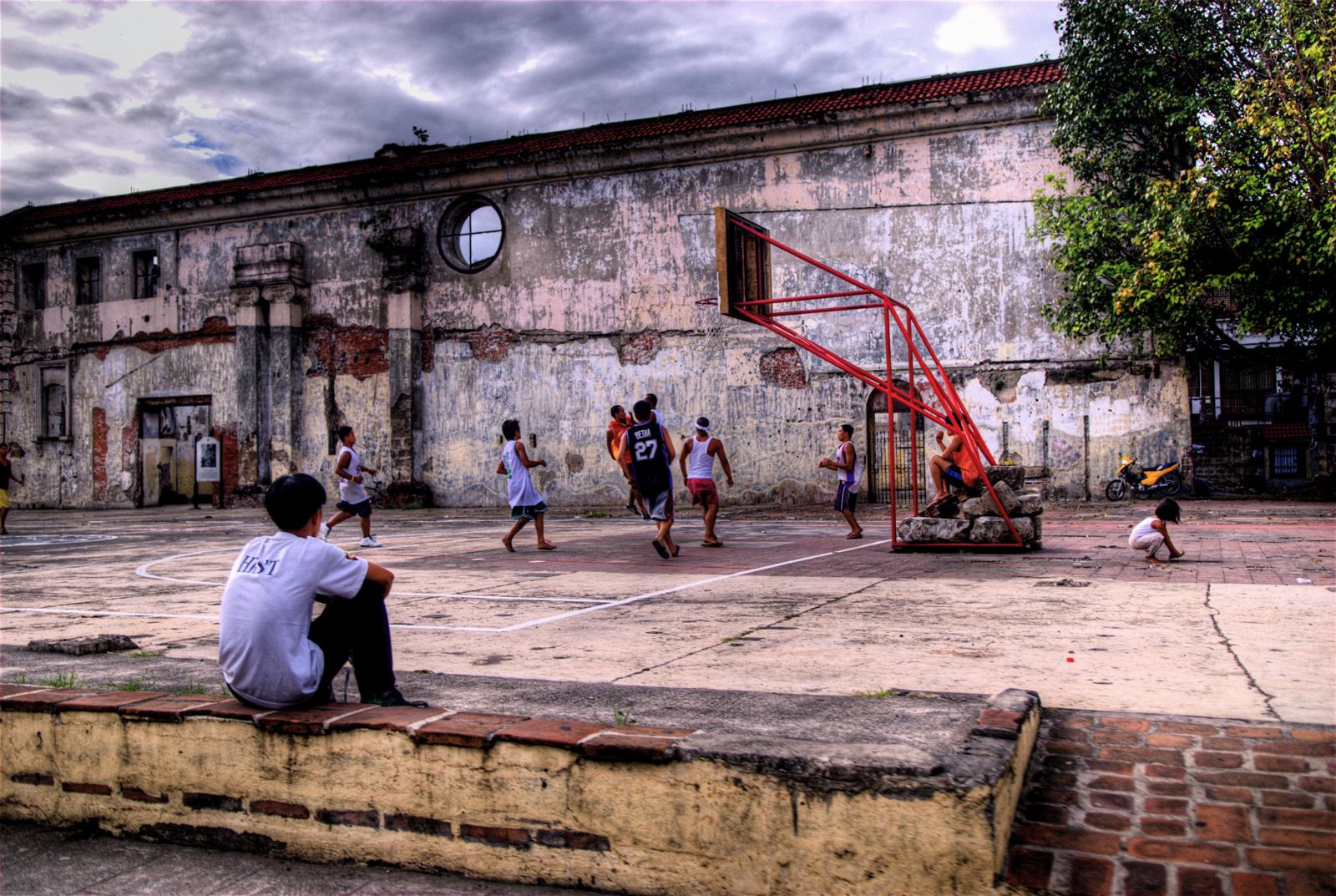
Youths playing basketball at the ruins of San Ignacio Church

The plans of the church and its adjacent school were kept at the Jesuit Archives in Manila. However, the plans did not reflect the construction as it was actually built at the former Jesuit compound. In 1879, the Jesuits were authorized to use the stones of the 17th century San Ignacio Church as foundation for the construction of the new church on Calle Arzobispo. Gustave Eiffel designed and supplied the metal framework for the church; this confirmed the contribution of Eiffel in Philippine church architecture, not only in San Sebastián Church as many believed.

The second church, or the fourth attempt of the Jesuits, built for St. Ignatius of Loyola was designed by the architect Félix Roxas Sr., the first recorded Filipino architect in classical and Renaissance style. The wooden interior and statuary were designed and executed by Isabelo Tampinco. His atelier and Agustín Sáez were charged with the altars and pulpit. Sáez was the director of the art academy in Manila and art teacher at the Ateneo Municipál. In 1889, construction of the church was completed.

Unfortunately, the church was destroyed during the Battle of Manila in 1945. It continuously burned for four days because of the heavy use of good local hardwood.

=== Centro de Turismo Intramuros ===
On June 9, 2024, First Lady Liza Araneta Marcos with Tourism Secretary Christina Frasco and Administrator lawyer Joan Padilla led the inauguration of new tourism hub, Centro de Turismo Intramuros. Located along Calle Arzobispo, within San Ignacio Church, its exhibits and 8,000 items of historical artifacts were extracted from Museo de Intramuros. Featuring an indoor amphitheater, it was designed as "first stop" in the Intramuros tour. John Paolo Castro, Philippine Institute of Interior Designers president, led the interior design of the center.

==== Museo de Intramuros ====
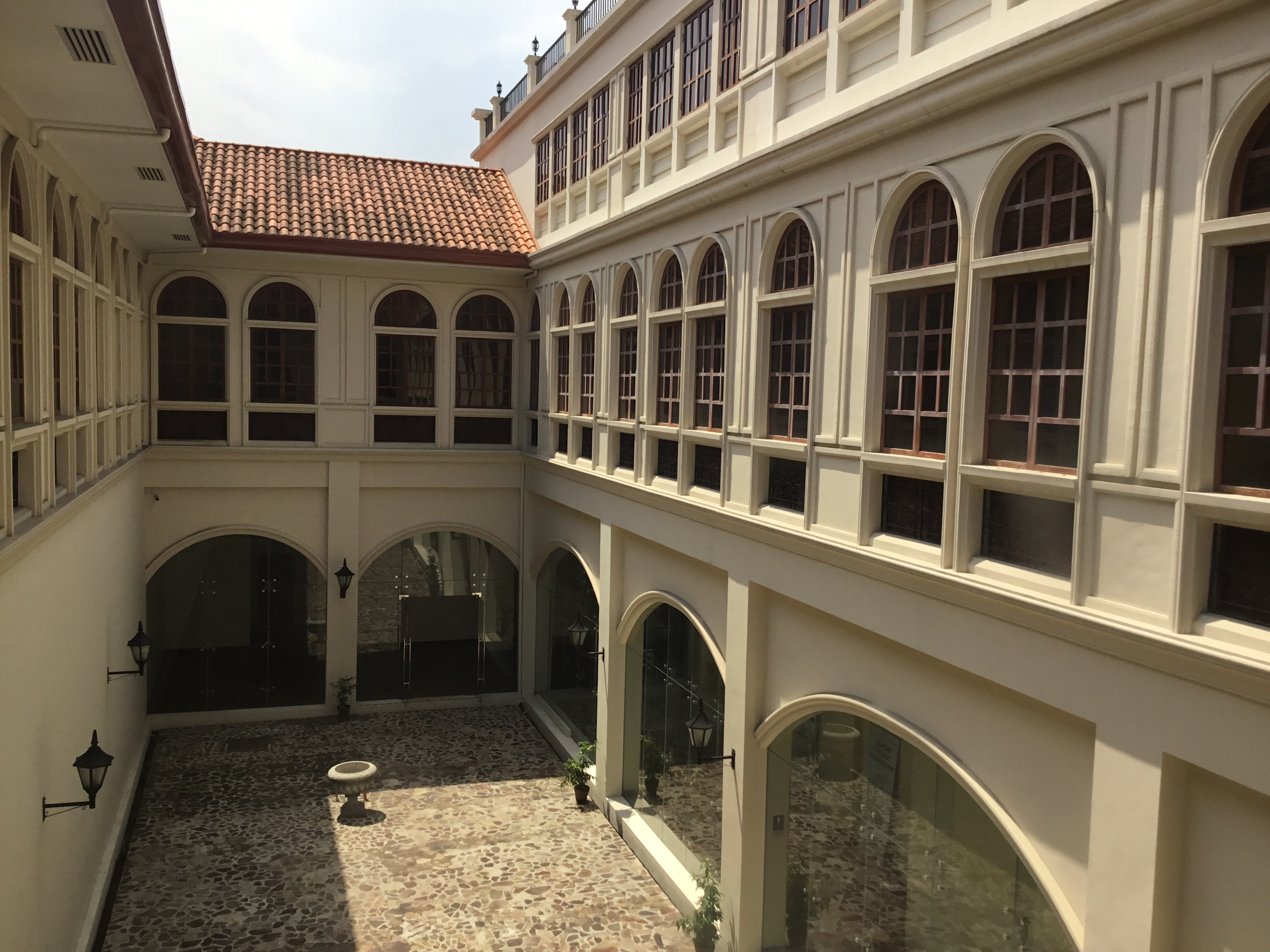
Interior courtyard of the Casa Misión

After it was destroyed in 1945, the property was acquired by the City of Manila. The Jesuits has kept the plans for the church; however, they did not rebuild in Intramuros and transferred to Loyola Heights, Quezon City and erected the Church of the Gesù there. The City of Manila rented out the property to different companies, which converted its ruins as an office space and a warehouse due to its proximity near the Manila South Harbor. Its ruins were altered by the private developers, such as putting additional circular window holes on the building envelope. Later on, the ruins of the church was turned into a basketball court.

Excavation and plans to restore the church began when the Intramuros Administration was created in 1979 through Presidential Decree No. 1616. The Intramuros Administration is currently rebuilding the church as a part of Museo de Intramuros, which is planned to be an ecclesiastical museum that will house a thousand artifacts that the Intramuros Administration had collected over time.

== Architectural features ==
For over 300 years, a mixture of architectural styles were implemented to establish a church in honor of St. Ignatius of Loyola: the Italianate Baroque style of architect Gianantonio Campioni, evolving into Neoclassical style of architect Félix Roxas Sr and Renaissance style through its interiors by Isabelo Tampinco.

The interiors of the first church or the 17th century San Ignacio Church were painted in 1700 by Jesuit brother Manuel Rodríguez, assisted by Tagalog apprentices.

The exterior façade of the second church reflected neoclassical proportions. However, its interiors are in the Renaissance Style with features such as arcaded and elevated galleries along the nave, a dark hardwood interior finish, an artesonado or coffered ceiling, fusion of bricks and piedra de Visayas or coral and limestone at the façade of the church, and pillars and outlines of portals and windows made up of white Carrara marble.

The church was spared from a fire that occurred on August 13, 1932, which started on a store on Calle Real. Gutted were most of the Jesuit compound (mostly comprising the Ateneo de Manila), the Augustinian Provincial House (Casa Procuración, also Casa Nueva; subsequently reconstructed as the ECJ Building), and Colegio de Santa Isabel. Besides the church, the headquarters of the Philippine Jesuit Mission (Casa Misión) was also spared, though partially damaged. When the Ateneo de Manila subsequently transferred to the newly built, Jesuit-owned San José Seminary on Padre Faura Street, Ermita, the church became a parish.

== See also ==
- Church of the Gesù, Quezon City, 21st century church by the Jesuits
- San Francisco Church of Intramuros
- List of Jesuit sites
