= Museo de Intramuros =

Ecclesiastical museum in Manila, Philippines

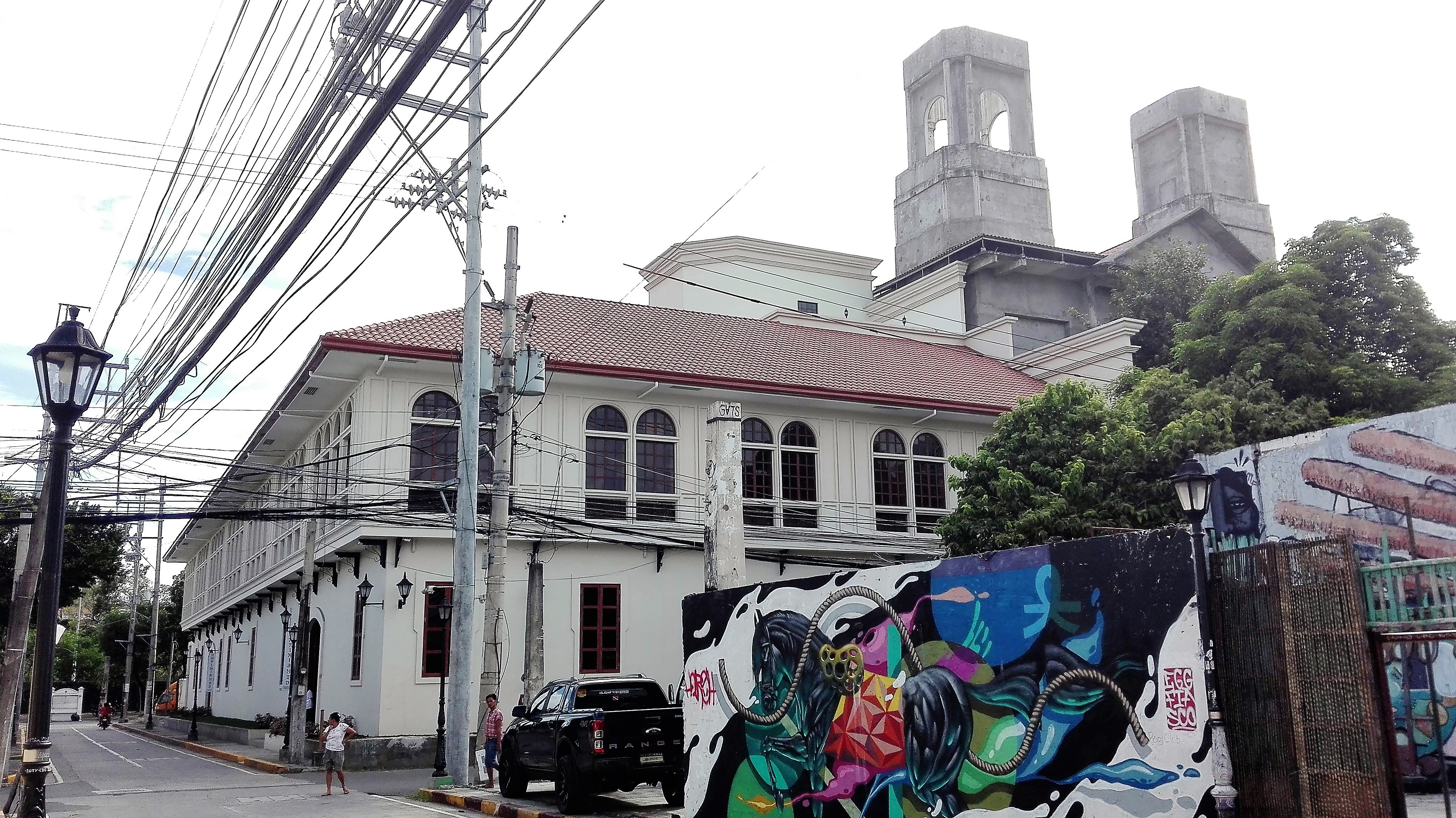
- Museo de Intramuros as seen in 2018
- Type: Ecclesiastical museum
- Collection size: 8,500
- Building details

General information
- Status: Open
- Location: Intramuros, Manila, Philippines
- Coordinates: 14°35′23″N 120°58′24″E
- Construction started: 2009
- Completed: 2019
- Owner: Intramuros Administration

Design and construction
- Architects: Félix Roxas, Sr. (original)

Museo de Intramuros (transl. Museum of Intramuros) is an ecclesiastical museum operated and managed by the Intramuros Administration. It is located at the reconstructed San Ignacio Church and Convent within the historic walled area of Intramuros in Manila, Philippines.

== San Ignacio Church and Convent ==
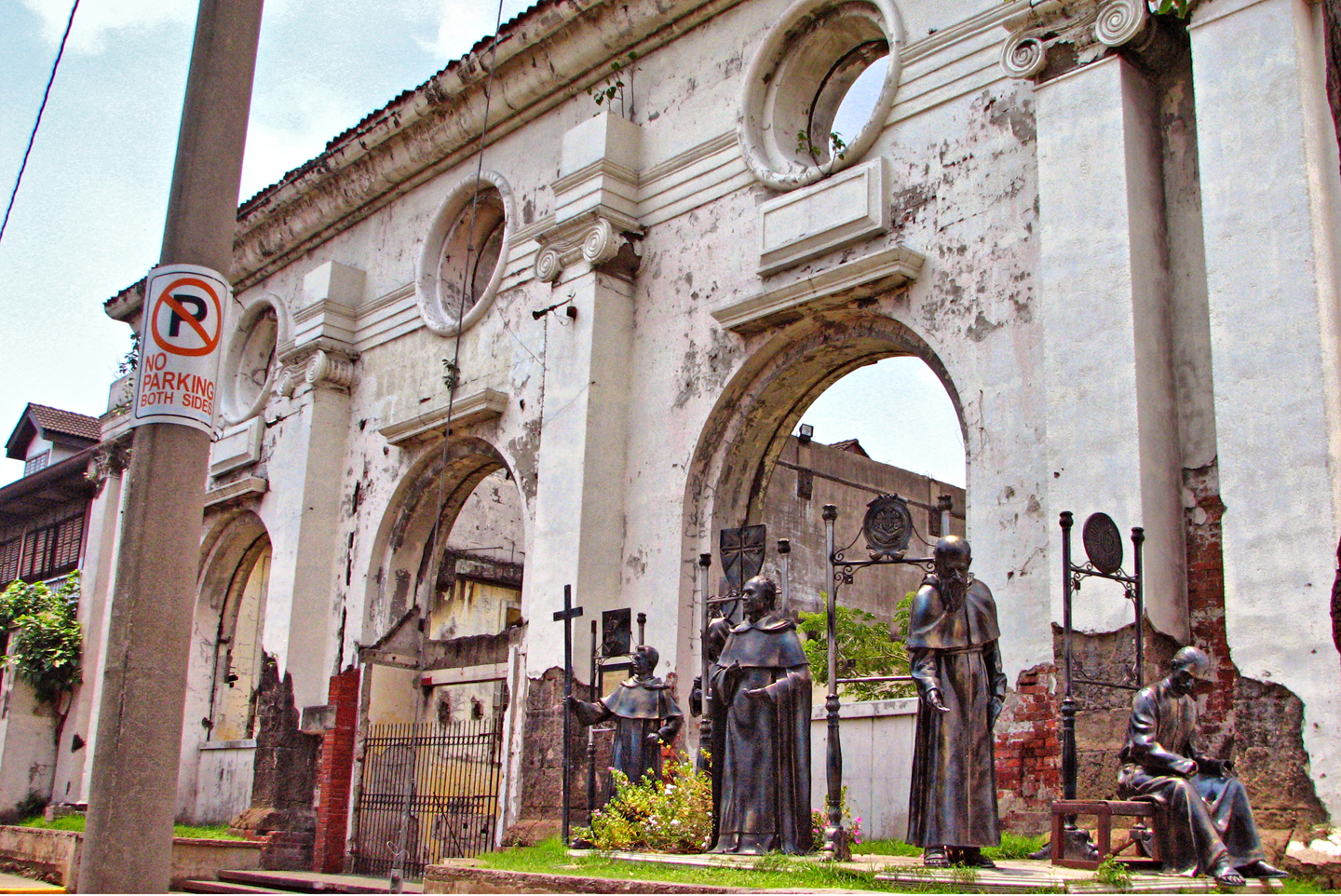
Ruins of San Ignacio Church showing its rear elevation

The San Ignacio Church and Convent located along Calle Arzobispo in Intramuros is the second church built by the Jesuits in honor of St. Ignatius of Loyola. It was their "Sueño Dorado" or the "Golden Dream". It was designed by Félix Roxas Sr., in Neoclassical Style. He was the first Filipino recorded architect. Its interiors, embellished with carvings made from dark local hardwood, had been designed by Isabelo Tampinco and reflects Renaissance Style. The church was destroyed during the Battle of Manila in 1945 when it was bombed by the American and Filipino forces. The church continuously burned for four days due to Tampinco's extensive use of rare Filipino Kamagong hardwood.

== Construction ==
=== Planning ===
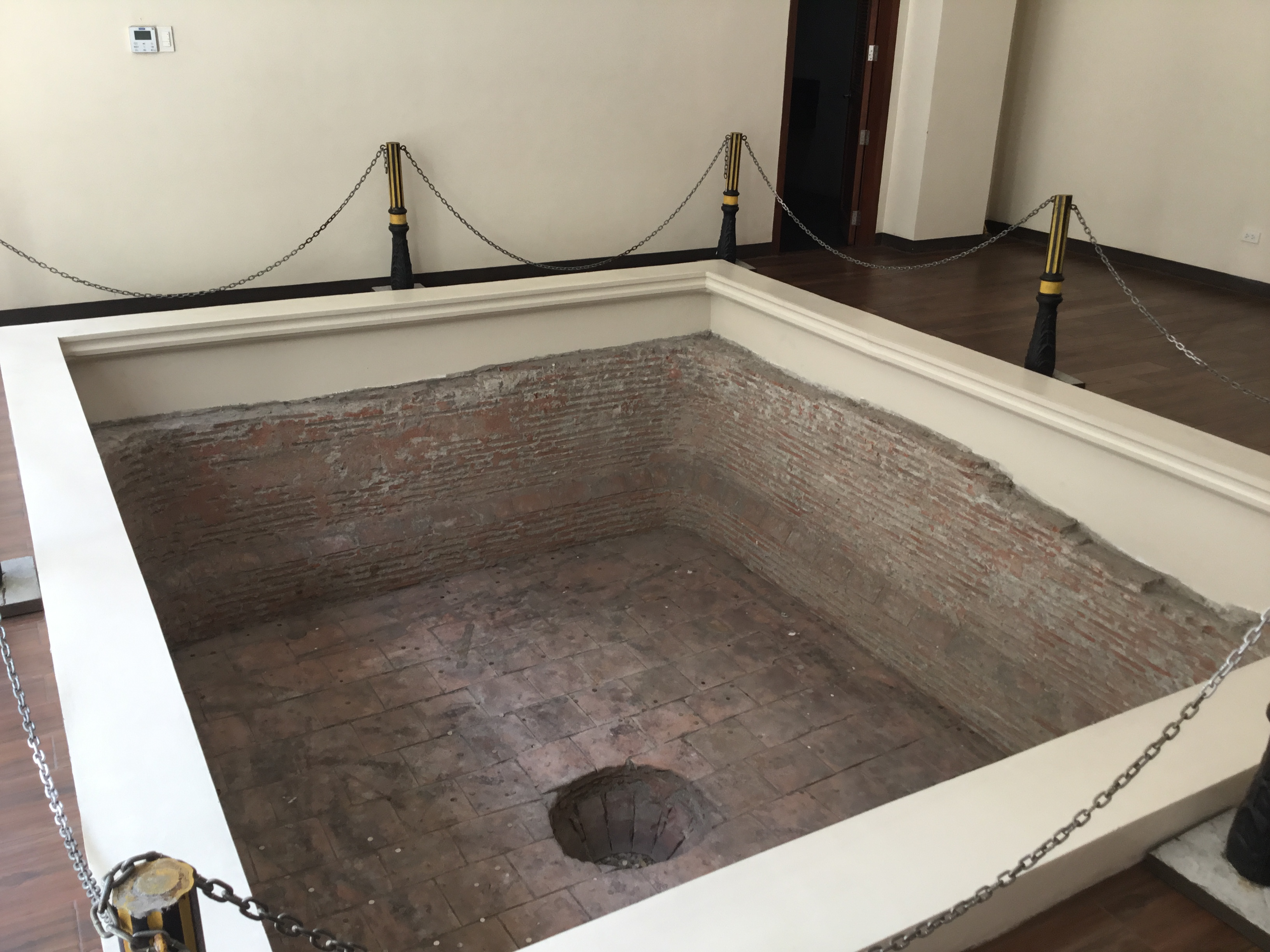
Interior of Casa Misión, showing one of its original old foundation

Excavation and plans to restore the church began when the Intramuros Administration was created in 1979 through Presidential Decree 1616. The excavation works was a joint project by the Intramuros Administration and the Cultural Properties and Archaeology Division of the National Museum of the Philippines. There were 500 artifacts discovered on the site of the San Ignacio Church Ruins, and one of them is known as the "Intramuros Pot Shard", the only artifact with ancient inscription recovered systematically.

The reconstruction works for San Ignacio Church and Convent has a ₱150-million budget from the National Commission on Culture and the Arts and the general appropriations. Its target completion date was 2012, but it was pushed back to late 2016 or early 2017. The budget was later reportedly raised to ₱300 million, and the target date of completion was further pushed back to late 2017. The reconstruction of San Ignacio Church and Convent is a part of the ₱900 million Intramuros Rehabilitation Program funded by the Tourism Infrastructure and Enterprise Zone (TIEZA). The program also calls for improvements along Fort Santiago, pedestrianization of the city streets, underground cabling along General Luna and A. Soriano Streets, and the construction of the Philippine Travel Center Complex of the Department of Tourism.

=== Rebuilding ===
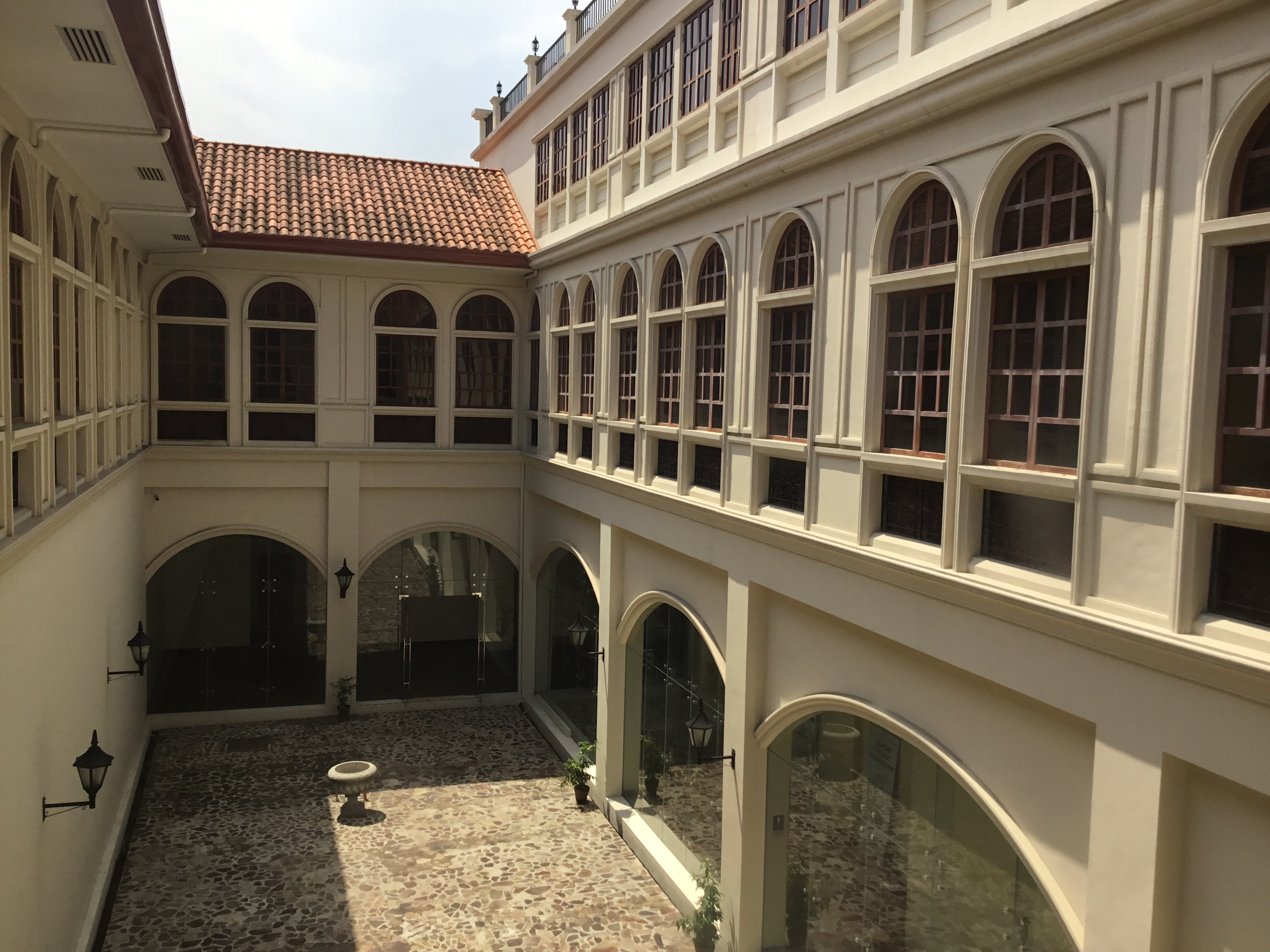
Interior courtyard of the Casa Misión

Construction of the museum commenced in 2009 at the site of the former San Ignacio Church and Convent. A Round Table discussion was held on June 1, 2017, at the Bayleaf Hotel in Intramuros, regarding the reconstruction of San Ignacio Church and Convent. Among those who joined are experts on museology, art and architecture history, and heritage conservation. The discussion included a consultation proper, detailed introduction on the San Ignacio Church, and a site visit and inspection of the ongoing construction of Museo de Intramuros. A second Round Table discussion was held on September 22, 2017, regarding the revised plans and intentions of the Intramuros Administration on the reconstructed San Ignacio Church and Convent vis-à-vis the recommendations put forward in the first meeting.

== Opening ==
Blessing ceremony for the opening of Casa Misión was held on January 22, 2018. The museum was opened to the public on February 3, 2018, for the Manila Biennale 2018. Several artworks were featured and displayed inside Casa Misión Convent and the main hall of the church. By the time of its opening, only the Jesuit Mission House was finished while the church was still under construction. Construction works were temporarily halted to give way for the exhibitions and art displays inside the museum.

== See also ==
- List of Jesuit sites
