= Plaza Mexico (disambiguation) =

Plaza Mexico is a bullring in Mexico City, Mexico.

Plaza Mexico (Mexico Square) may also refer to:

Austria

- Mexikoplatz in Vienna

Ethiopia

- Mexico Square in Addis Ababa

Philippines

- Plaza Mexico (Manila) in Intramuros, Manila

USA

- Plaza México (Lynwood, California)

== See also ==
- Plaza de España
