= Binondo–Intramuros Bridge =

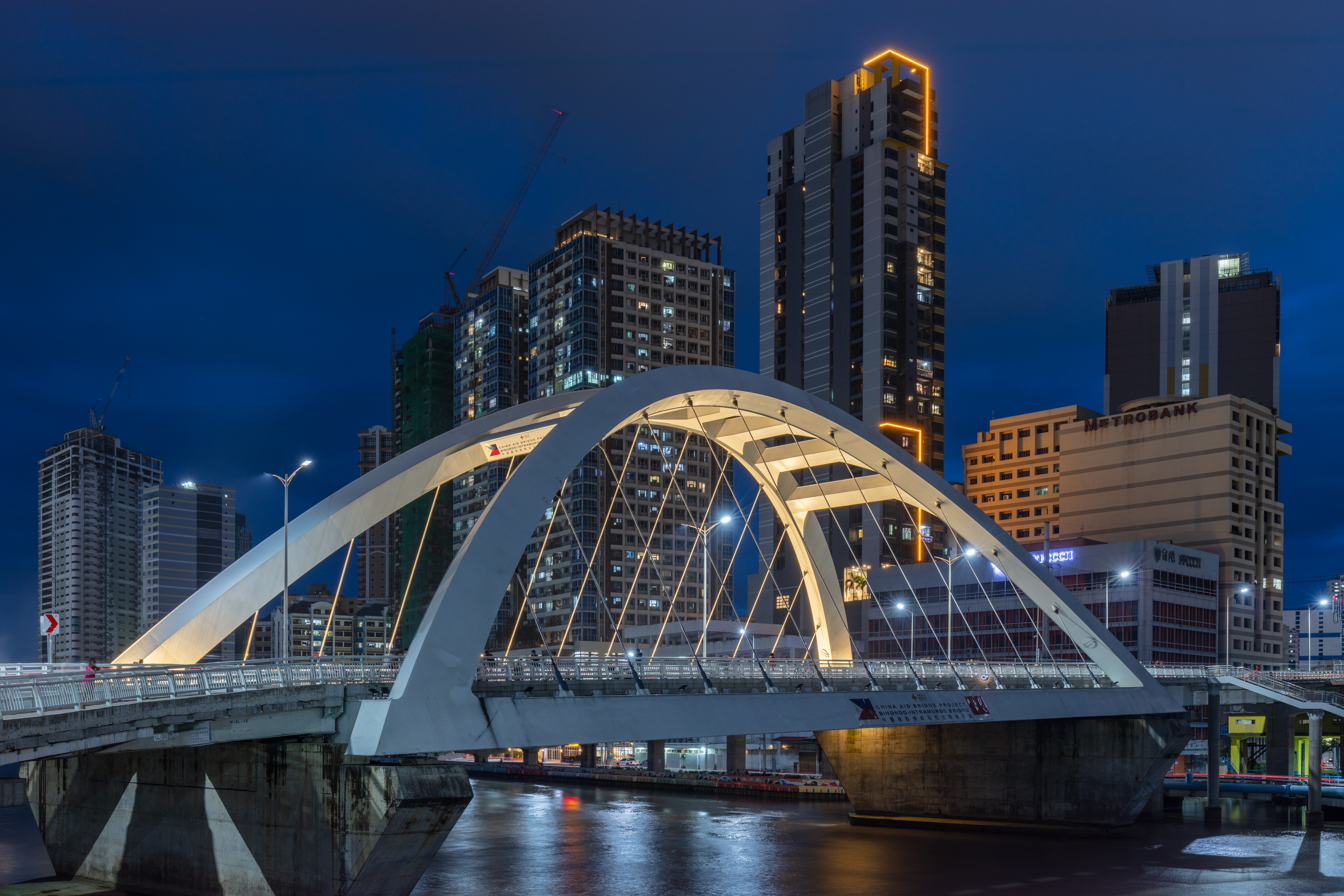
- The bridge in August 2023
- Coordinates: 14°35′42.97″N 120°58′29.32″E
- Carries: Vehicular traffic and pedestrians
- Crosses: Pasig River
- Locale: Manila, Philippines
- Maintained by: Department of Public Works and Highways
- Preceded by: Roxas Bridge
- Followed by: Jones Bridge

Characteristics
- Design: Tied-arch bridge
- Material: Steel
- Pier construction: Concrete
- Total length: 680 m (2,230 ft)
- Width: 21.65 m (71.0 ft)
- Longest span: 70 m (230 ft)
- No. of lanes: 4

History
- Constructed by: China Road and Bridge Corporation
- Construction start: July 17, 2018
- Construction cost: ₱3.39 billion
- Opened: April 5, 2022; 4 years ago

Statistics
- Daily traffic: 30,000 vehicles

Location
- Interactive map of Binondo–Intramuros Bridge

The Binondo–Intramuros Bridge is a tied-arch bridge in Manila, Philippines, spanning the Pasig River. It connects Muelle de Binondo in Binondo and San Nicolas to Solana Street and Riverside Drive in Intramuros. The bridge has four lanes and exhibits a steel bowstring arch design with inclined arches. It is 680 meters (2,230 ft) long.

The bridge is controversial due to its location at the historic center of Manila, near the San Agustin Church heritage site.

== History ==
=== Planning and funding ===
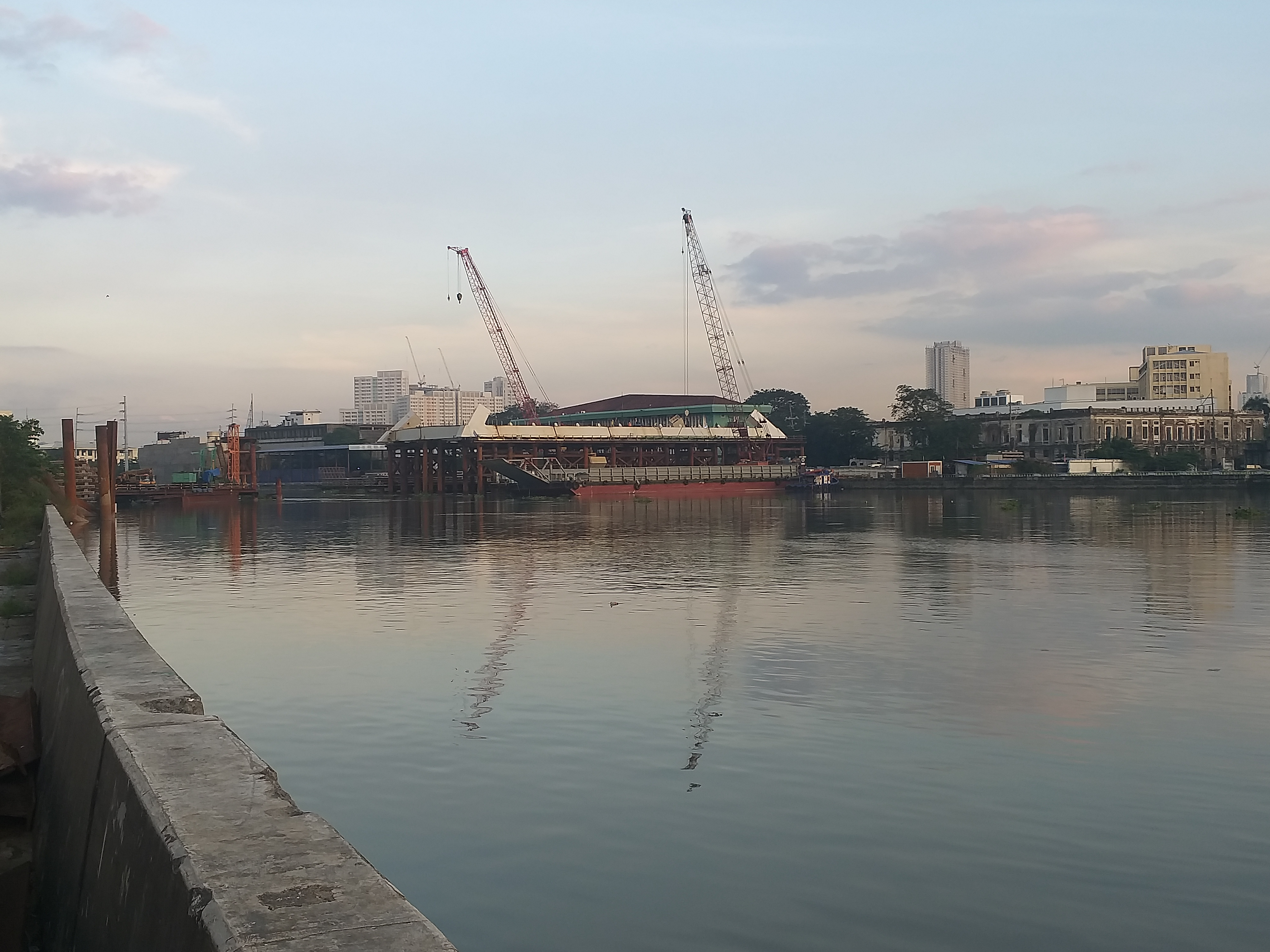
December 2020

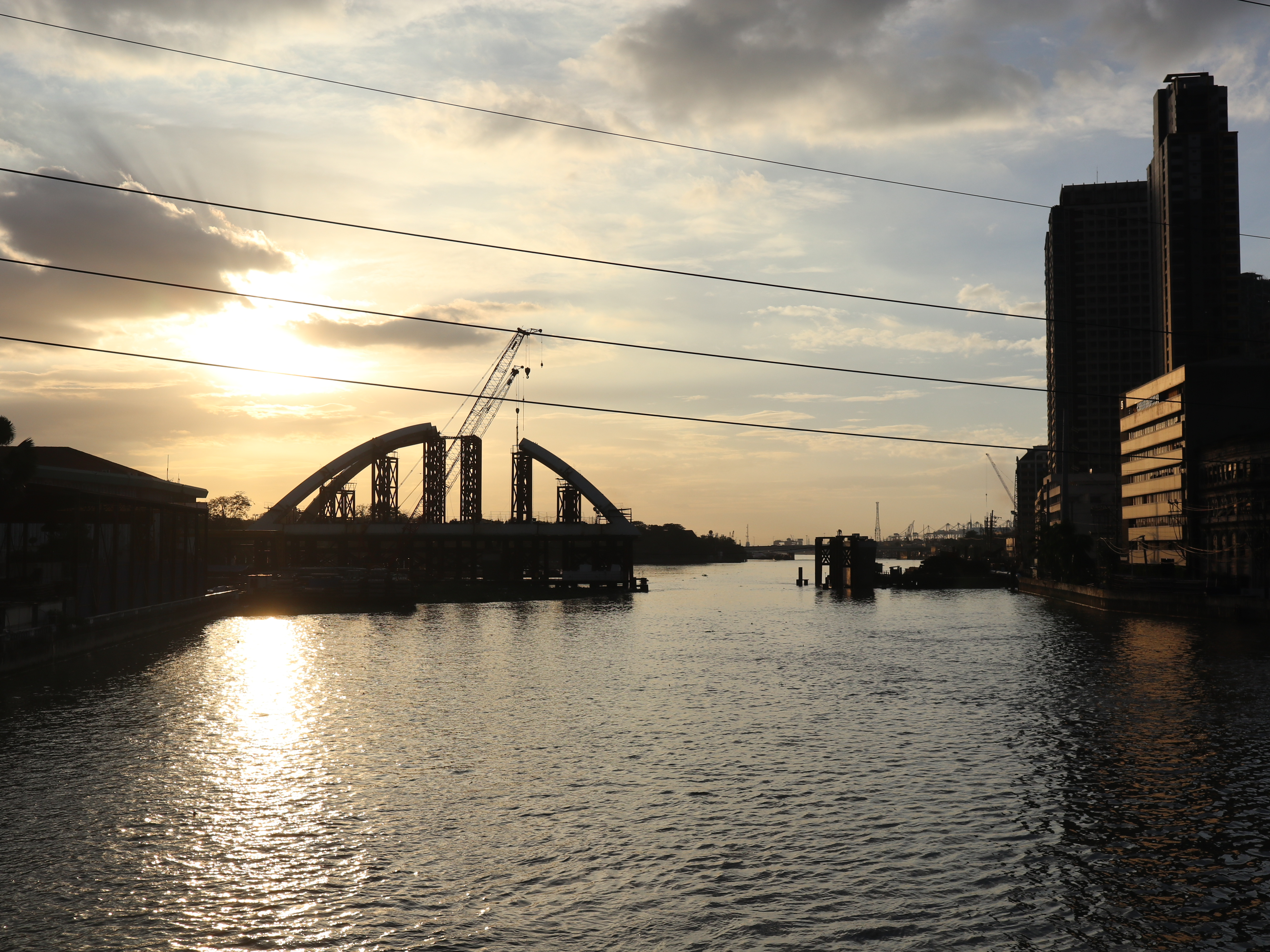
February 2021

The bridge under construction

The bridge is a part of the CN¥500 million (₱3.6 billion) infrastructure grant by China under the Agreement on Economic and Technical Cooperation agreed upon by China and the Philippines following a state visit of Philippine President Rodrigo Duterte to China in May 2017. On June 22, 2017, the Department of Public Works and Highways and the Chinese embassy signed a Minutes of Discussion regarding the full grant and financing of the bridge's construction. The feasibility study for the bridge was completed in mid-2017.

=== Construction and opening ===
Construction was expected to begin in 2017. The DPWH Unified Project Management Office-Roads Management Cluster I will implement the construction of the bridge, while China Road and Bridge Corporation will be the contractor. President Rodrigo Duterte led the groundbreaking ceremony for the bridge on July 17, 2018. The bridge was expected to be completed in September 2021 but was delayed to December 2021 due to the COVID-19 pandemic.

President Duterte and other government officials inaugurated the bridge on April 5, 2022, and it was opened on the same day.

== Design ==
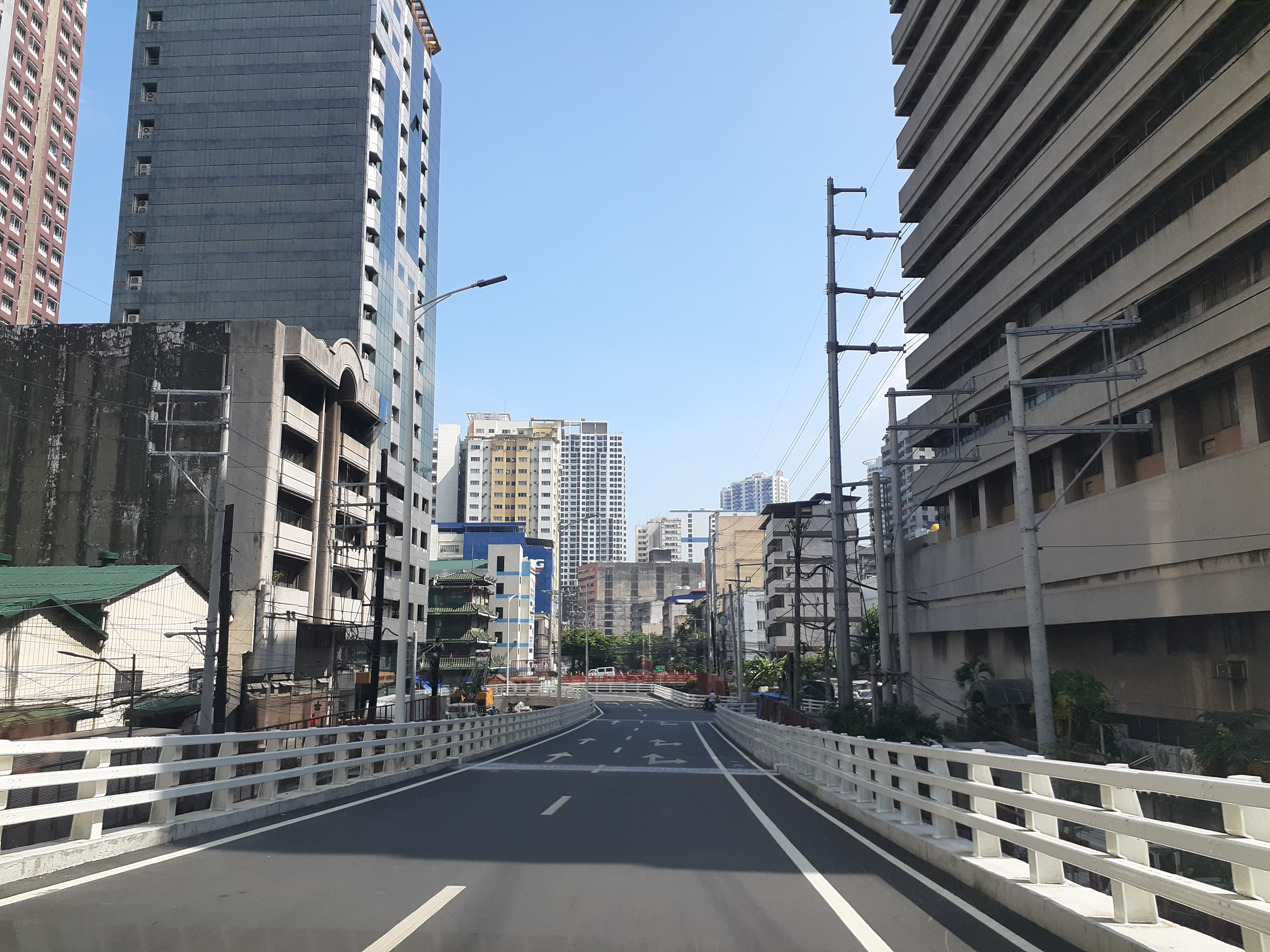
Exit ramp at Binondo side

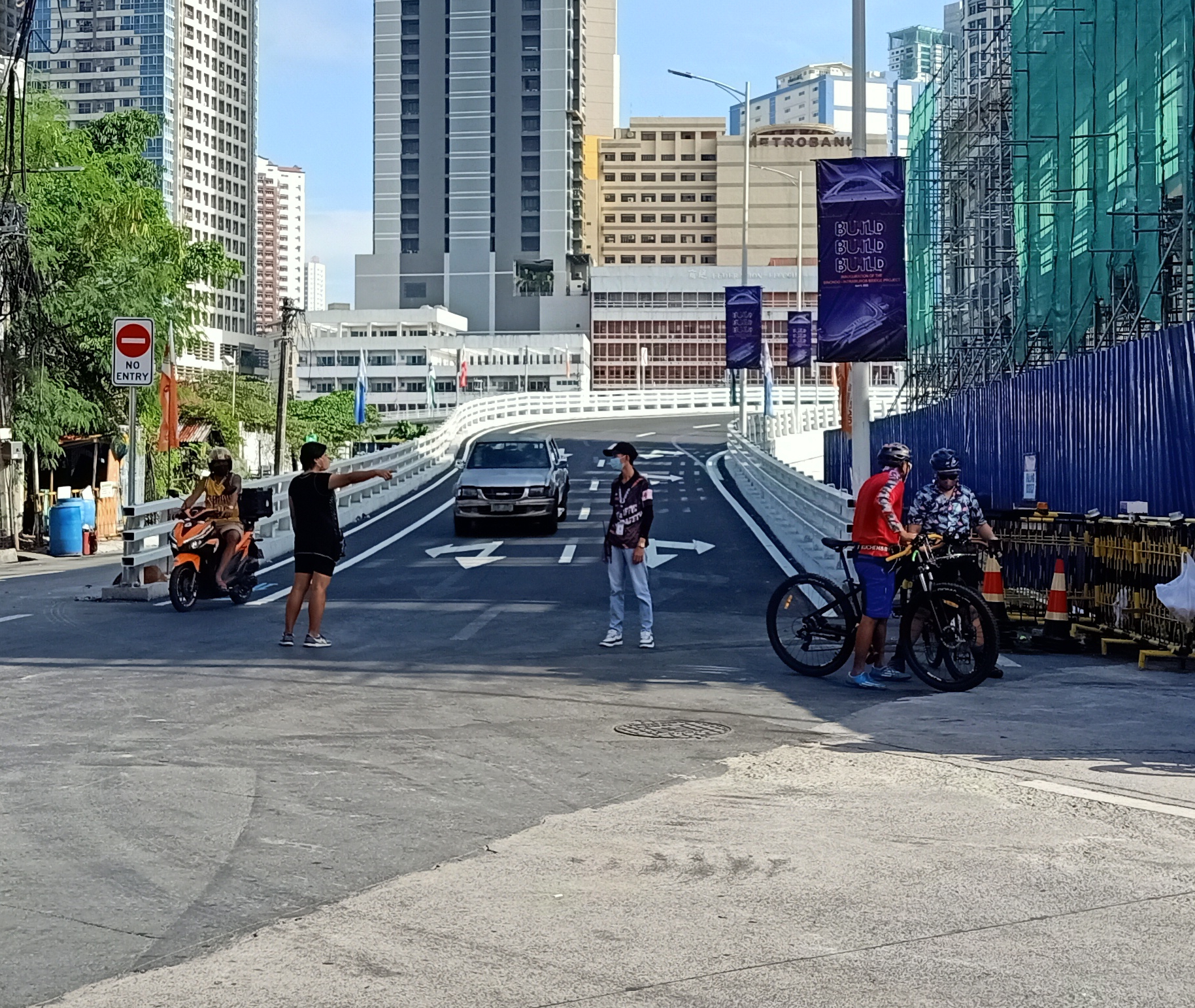
Exit ramp at Intramuros side

Designed according to new seismic specifications and considering the impact of climate change, the bridge is a basket-handle tied-arch bridge. Its main span is 70 meters (230 ft) long and 21.65 meters (71.0 ft) wide.

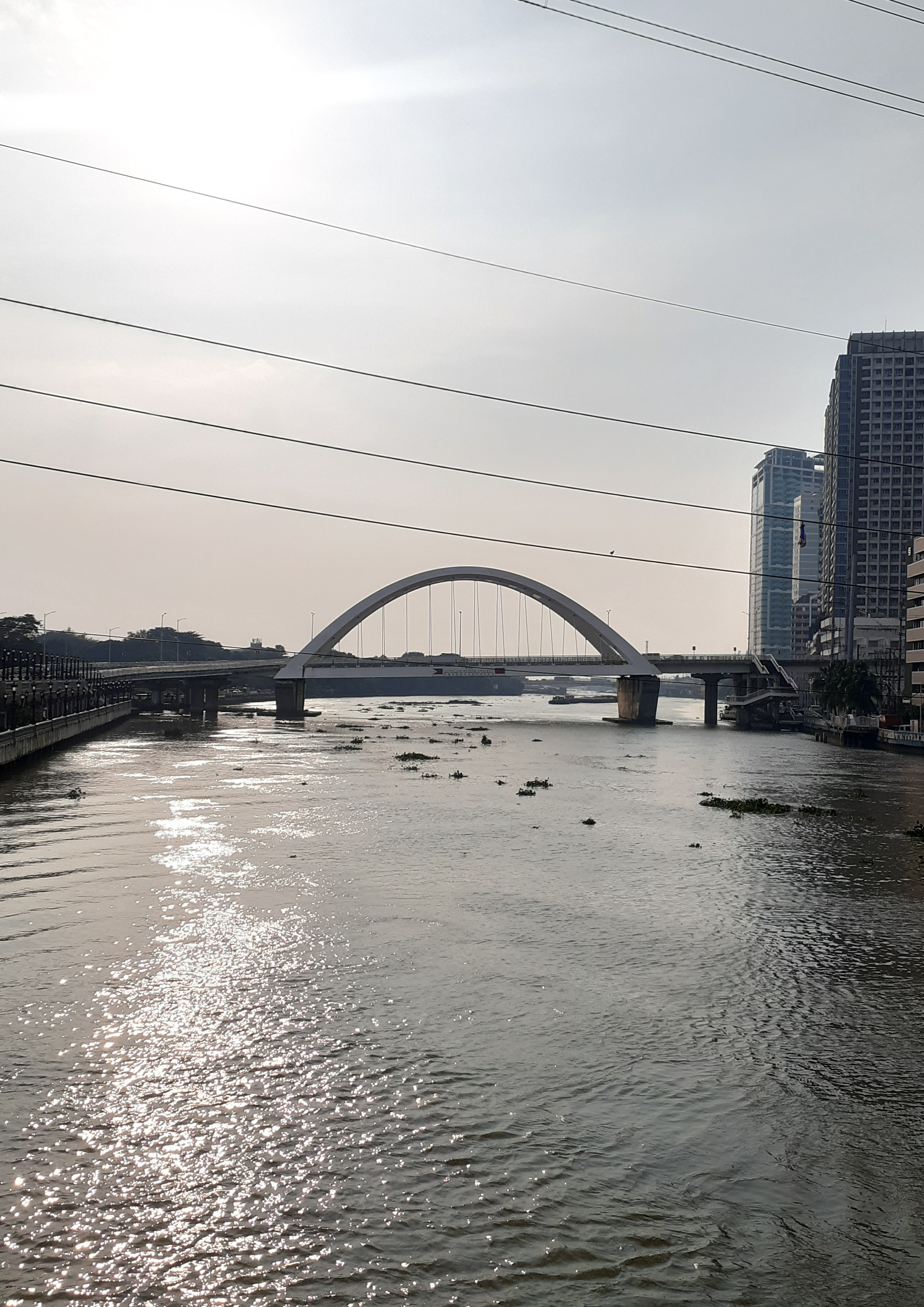
Binondo Intramuros Bridge seen from Jones Bridge as of October 2024

The ramps on both sides branch out to different streets. The entrance ramp on the Binondo side is located along Muelle de la Industria in San Nicolas. Its exit ramp on the same side runs above Estero de Binondo, ending at Muelle de Binondo, intersecting Santo Cristo Street (near South San Nicolas Volunteer Fire Brigade) in San Nicolas on the west bank and Rentas Street in Binondo on the east bank. On the other hand, the entrance ramp on the Intramuros side is located along Riverside Drive. Its exit ramp ends at the intersection of Andres Soriano Avenue, Muralla Street, and Solana Street, just beside the Aduana Building.

== Reception ==
Heritage conservationist groups have expressed concerns regarding the proposed bridge. International Council on Monuments and Sites (ICOMOS) Philippines advises against constructing a vehicular bridge connecting Binondo and Intramuros, suggesting a pedestrian bridge instead. A study conducted by the organization found that the construction of the proposed Binondo–Intramuros Bridge will likely affect the Aduana Building in Intramuros due to its soft foundation, as well as the Chamber of Commerce Building and Plaza Mexico. It also notes that the bridge will cover the Estero de Binondo and the Puente de San Fernando will be demolished to give way for the bridge's construction. ICOMOS Philippines has also said the bridge will worsen traffic conditions and cause visual and air pollution. The organization also notes that the ramps of the proposed bridge will affect the buffer zone of the San Agustin Church and Monastery, a World Heritage Site. The case of the delisting of the City of Dresden as a World Heritage Site due to the construction of the Waldschlösschen Bridge was cited by ICOMOS Philippines concerning the proposed Binondo–Intramuros Bridge. It has raised concerns that the bridge project could threaten the bid of the whole Intramuros area to become a UNESCO World Heritage Site.

The Heritage Conservation Society has also opposed the project, while the Advocates for Heritage Preservation has urged the bridge to be designed to complement the area's Spanish colonial architecture. The Chamber of Commerce of the Philippine Islands has also opposed the planned bridge due to heritage and pollution concerns. Instead, it proposed to expand the Del Pan and Jones Bridges.

Despite its controversial nature, the bridge has become a new hangout for sightseers due to its unique design since its opening. A daily gathering of people taking pictures and posing beside the structure has been noted, especially in good weather. A police outpost has been set up at the bridge to dissuade excessive crowd gathering and to usher traffic.

== In popular culture ==
The bridge was one of the key locations in the Philippine action TV series FPJ's Batang Quiapo on several occasions throughout the show.

== See also ==
- List of crossings of the Pasig River
- Estrella–Pantaleon Bridge
- China–Philippines relations
- Build! Build! Build!
