= Magallanes monument =

Magallanes Monument
- Monumentong Magallanes (Filipino)
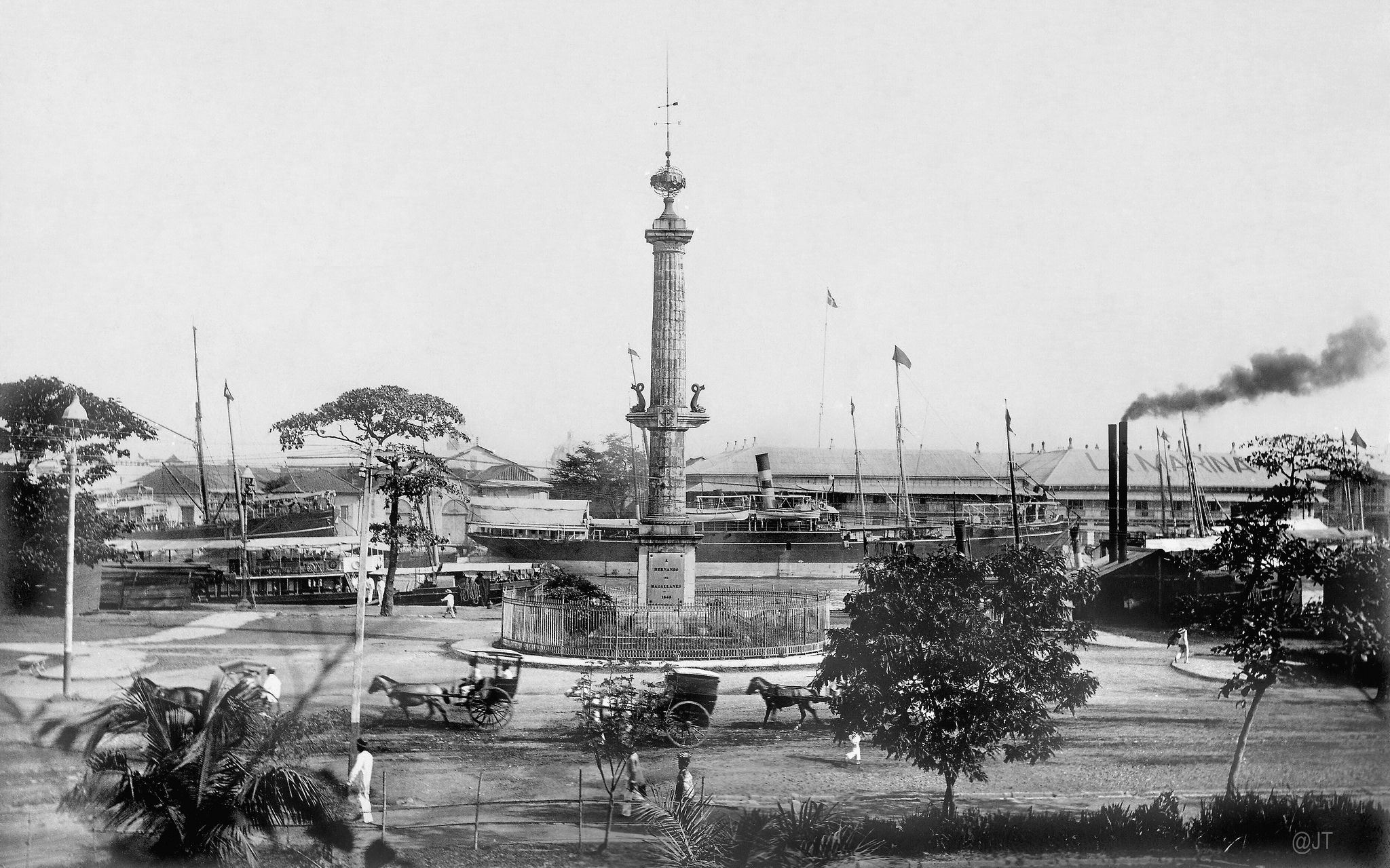
- Magallanes monument and Paseo de Magallanes in the early 1900s
- Location: Intramuros, Manila
- Material: Marble, Bronze
- Completion date: 1848
- Destroyed: Liberation of Manila 1945

The Magallanes monument was a monument dedicated in honor of Portuguese explorer Ferdinand Magellan. The monument was last located in Paseo de Magallanes (also called Magallanes Park, now Plaza Mexico) front of the Intendencia building and beside the Commission of Census Building in Intramuros, Manila. The monument was destroyed during the Liberation of Manila.

== History ==
The monument to Magellan was funded by public donation by Governor General Narciso Claveria. The monument was supposed to be erected in Cebu, near the environs where Magellan perished, however it was built near the Isabel II gate and the Puente de España.

It was relocated in 1904 in Paseo de Magallanes front of the Intendencia building and beside the Commission of Census Building in Intramuros, Manila.

Due to its proximity to the Pasig river, a major water thoroughfare at the time, many shipments of coal, lumber and other government apparatuses were stored in its vicinity. These supplies were transferred to Calle Nozaleda (now Gen. Luna st.) allowing open access to the park in 1906. The Paseo had been a loading dock for passenger boats, and a favorite among passersby talking their constitutionals.

== Design ==
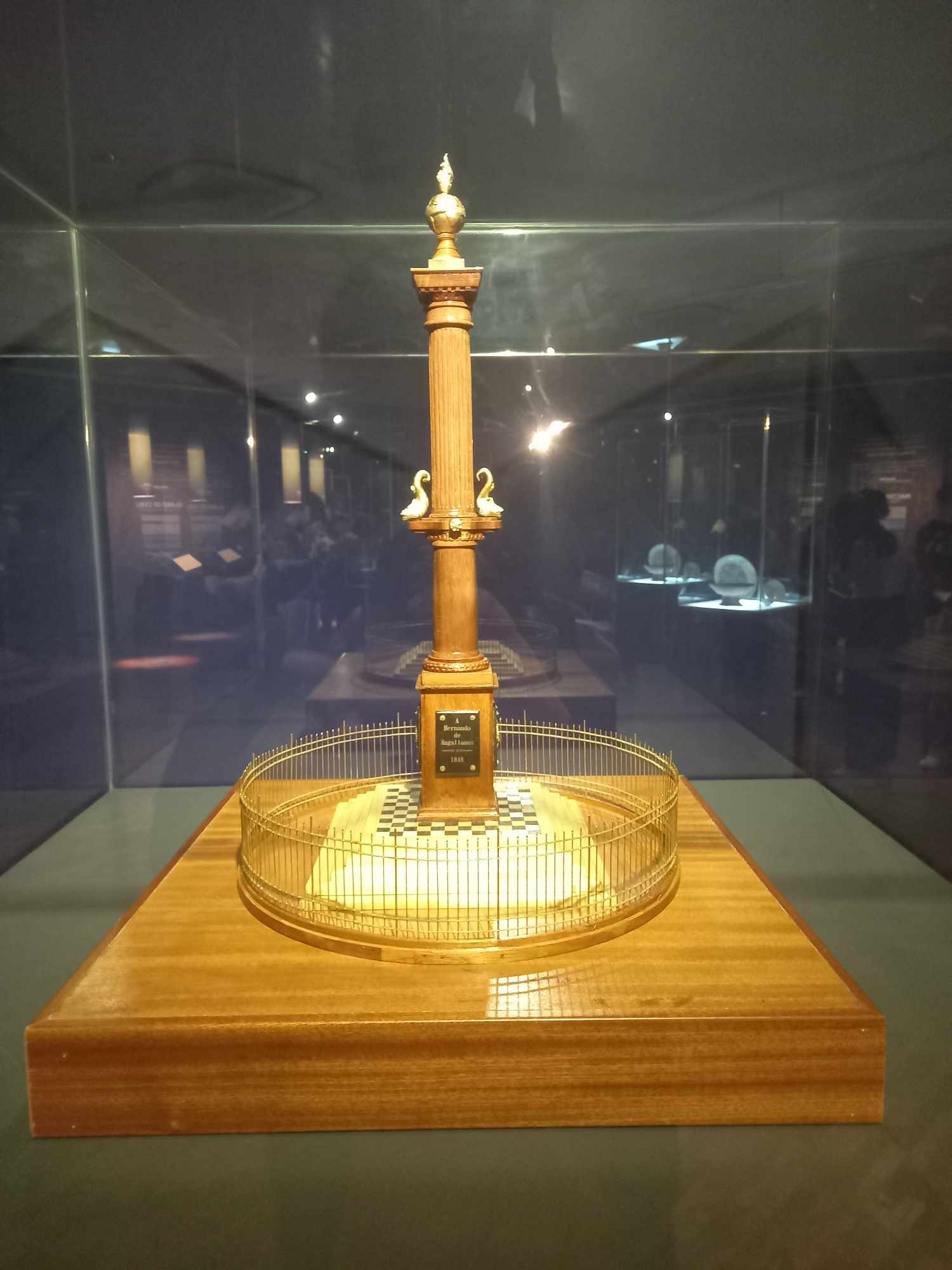
Scale model of the Magallanes monument in Intramuros in the National Museum of Fine Arts of the Philippines.

The monument is largely made of marble inspired by a roman Doric column. On its plinth emblazoned are the words A HERNANDO DE MAGALLANES 1848. About a third of the way is a capital-like ornamentation where a symbol of an anchor and laurel is in the middle, on both sides are Leodelfin. On top of the column is a bronze globe topped with a compass. The globe was inscribed with MAGALLANES. The monument was encircled by a tall iron fencing.

== Destruction ==
The monument incurred severe damage during the Liberation of Manila. In or about in its position is the Expedicion Maritima Mexico-Filipinas 1564-1964 monument.
