= San Agustin Church (Manila) =

Roman Catholic church in Manila, Philippines

- Archdiocesan Shrine of Our Lady of Consolation and Cincture
- Immaculate Conception Parish
- Simbahan ng San Agustin, Pang-Arkidiyosesis na Dambana ng Mahal na Birhen ng La Consolación y Correa (Filipino); Iglesia de San Agustín, Santuario Arquidiocesano de Nuestra Señora de la Consolación y Correa (Spanish)
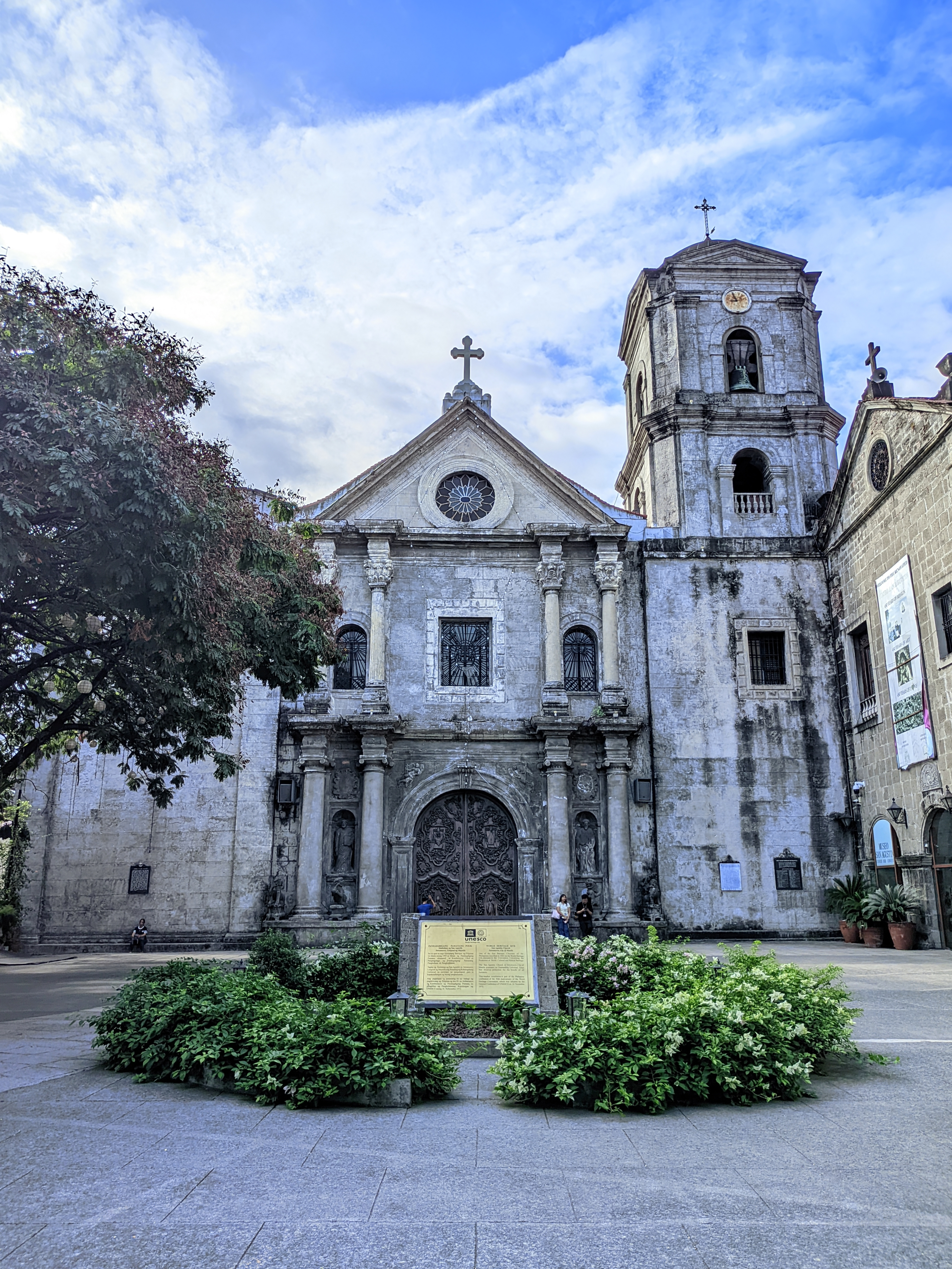
- Church façade in May 2026
- San Agustin Church
- 14°35′20″N 120°58′31″E
- Location: Intramuros, Manila
- Country: Philippines
- Denomination: Catholic Church
- Sui iuris church: Latin Church
- Religious order: Order of St. Augustine

History
- Former name: Iglesia de San Pablo de Manila (Spanish)
- Founded: 1571; 455 years ago
- Founder: Augustinians
- Dedication: Paul the Apostle
- Consecrated: 1607; 419 years ago

Architecture
- Functional status: Active
- Heritage designation: World Heritage Site
- Designated: 1993
- Architect: Juan Macías
- Architectural type: Church and convent
- Style: Baroque
- Years built: c. 1571 (dst. 1574); c. 1575 (dst. 1583); 1586–1607
- Groundbreaking: 1586; 440 years ago
- Completed: January 19, 1607; 419 years ago

Specifications
- Length: 67.15 m (220.3 ft)
- Width: 24.93 m (81.8 ft)
- Materials: Adobe stones

Administration
- Archdiocese: Manila
- Deanery: Nuestra Señora de Guia
- Parish: Immaculate Conception

Clergy
- Rector: Fray Reynante Bansale Balilo, O.S.A.

UNESCO World Heritage Site
- Official name: Immaculate Conception Parish - San Agustin Church
- Part of: Baroque Churches of the Philippines
- Criteria: Cultural: (ii)(iv)
- Reference: 677bis-001
- Inscription: 1993 (17th Session)
- Extensions: 2013
- Area: 2.43 ha (262,000 sq ft)
- Buffer zone: 106.13 ha (11,424,000 sq ft)

National Historical Landmarks
- Official name: Church of San Agustin
- Type: House of worship
- Designated: August 1, 1973; 53 years ago
- Reference no.: No. 260, s. 1973
- Region: National Capital Region
- Marker date: 1998; 28 years ago

The Archdiocesan Shrine of Our Lady of Consolation and Cincture, also known as the San Agustin Church (Filipino: Simbahan ng San Agustín) and Immaculate Conception Parish (Filipino: Parokya ng Kalinis-linisang Concepción), is a Roman Catholic church under the auspices of the Order of Saint Augustine located inside the historic walled city of Intramuros in Manila, Philippines. Completed in 1607, it is the oldest stone church in the country.

In 1993, San Agustin Church was one of four Philippine churches constructed during the Spanish colonial period to be designated as a World Heritage Site by UNESCO, under the collective title Baroque Churches of the Philippines. It was named a National Historical Landmark by the Philippine government in 1976.

== History ==
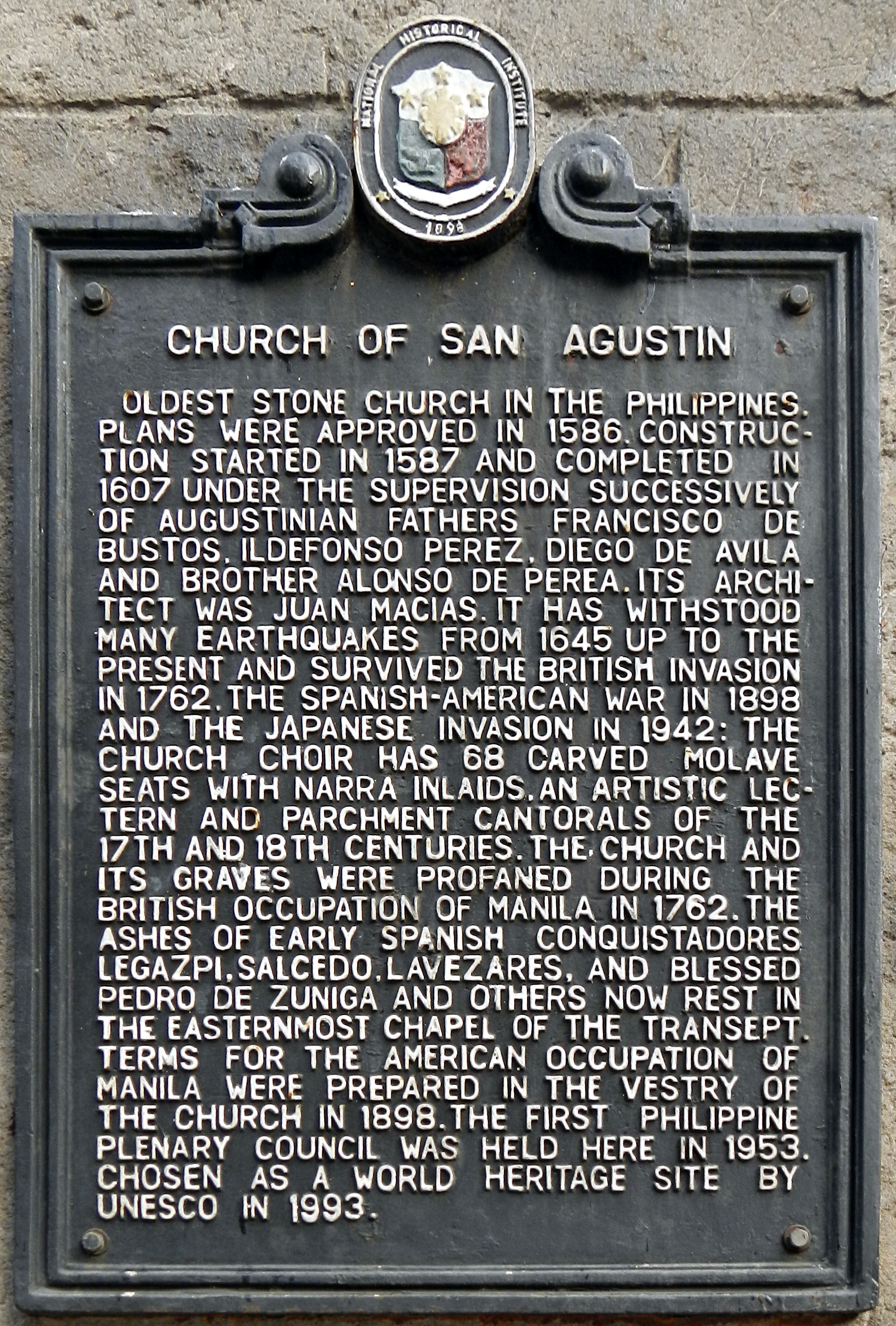
Church NHI historical marker installed in 1934

Located along General Luna Street in Intramuros, the present structure is the third Augustinian church erected on the site. The first San Agustin Church was the first religious structure constructed by the Spaniards on the island of Luzon. Made of bamboo and nipa, it was completed in 1571, but destroyed by fire in December 1574 during the attempted invasion of Manila by the forces of Limahong. A second wooden structure built on the same site was destroyed in February 1583 by a fire that started when a candle ignited drapery on the funeral bier during services for Spanish Governor-General Gonzalo Ronquillo de Peñalosa.

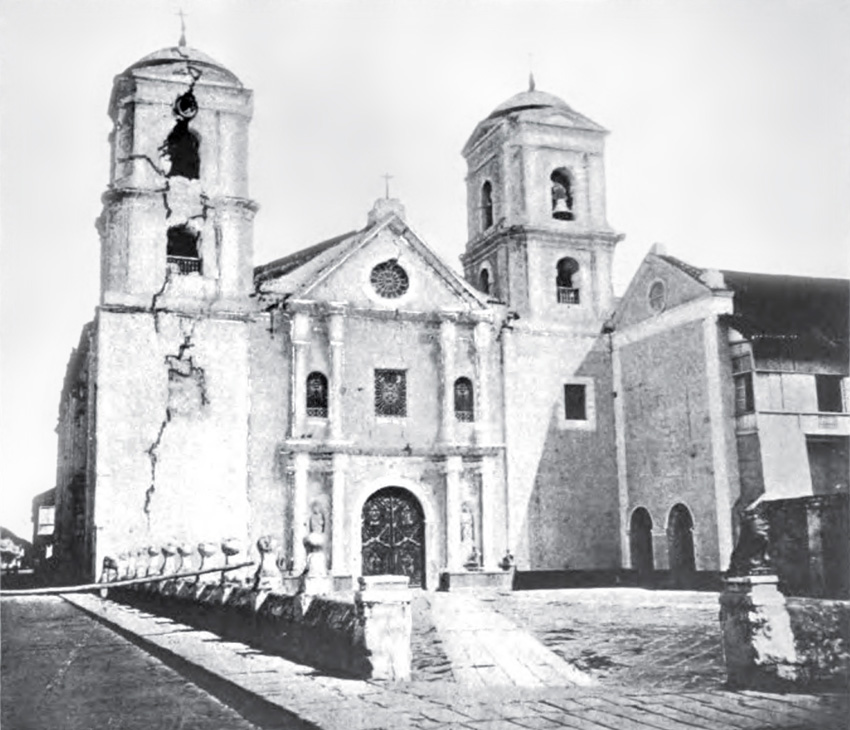
San Agustin Church after the 1880 earthquake

The Augustinians decided to rebuild the church using stone, and to construct an adjacent monastery. Construction began in 1586, based on a design by Juan Macías. The structure was built using hewn adobe stones quarried from Meycauayan, Binangonan and San Mateo, Rizal. The work proceeded slowly due to the lack of funds and materials, as well as the relative scarcity of stone artisans. The monastery was operational by 1604, and the church was formally declared complete on January 19, 1607, and named Church of Saint Paul of Manila. Macías, who had died before the completion of the church, was officially acknowledged by the Augustinians as the builder of the edifice. In 1617, Fray Vicente de Sepulveda, Rector Provincial of the Order of Saint Augustine by a group of four priests inside the church.

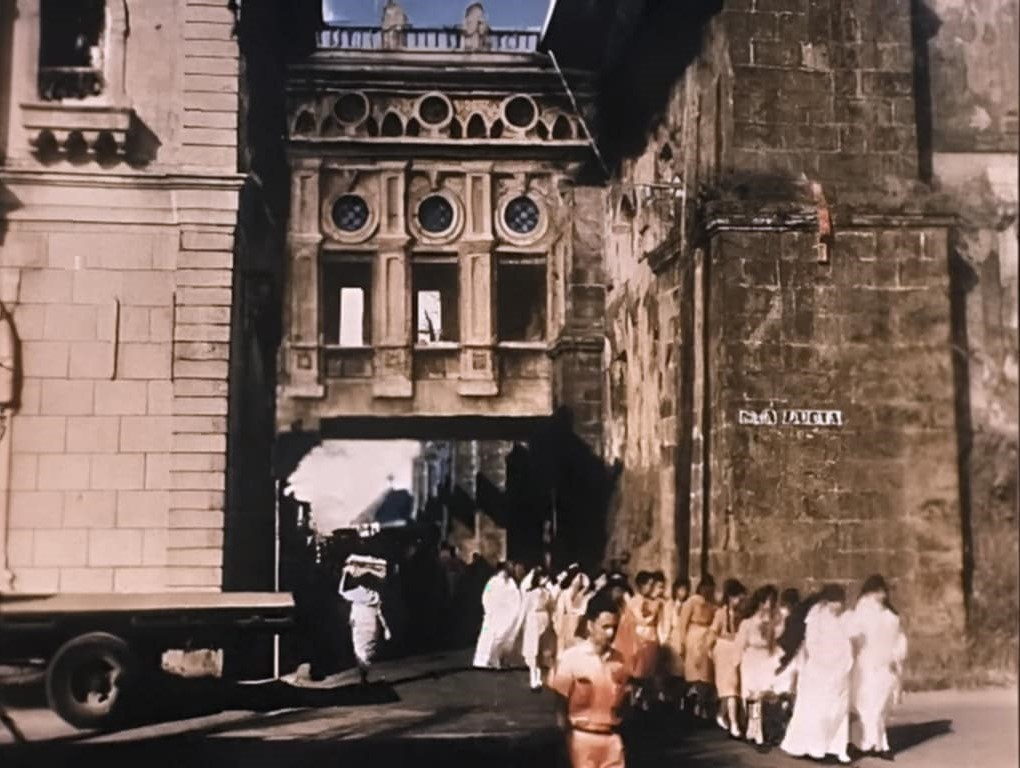
Augustinian Provincial House footbridge over Real Street.

San Agustin Church was sacked during the Battle of Manila, which occurred as part of the Seven Years' War. In 1854, the church was renovated under the supervision of Spanish architect Luciano Oliver. On June 3, 1863, the strongest earthquake at that time hit Manila leaving widespread destruction to the city, with San Agustin Church the only public building left undamaged. A series of strong earthquakes struck Manila again on July 18–20, 1880. This time, the tremors left a large crack in the east bell tower. The crack was eventually repaired, but the left tower was permanently removed with only the base remaining today. The church withstood the other major earthquakes that struck Manila before in 1645, 1699, 1754, 1796, 1825, 1852, 1863 and 1880 and served as a hospital for several of those injured during the earthquake in 1863.

On August 18, 1898, the church was where Spanish Governor-General Fermín Jaudenes prepared the terms for the surrender of Manila to the United States of America following the Spanish–American War.

On the night of August 13, 1932, a major fire inside Intramuros destroyed a portion of the adjacent San Agustin Monastery. The blaze also totally destroyed the Augustinian Provincial House across the road on Calle Real, as well as the ornate pedestrian bridge that once linked the Provincial House with the monastery.

=== World War II ===
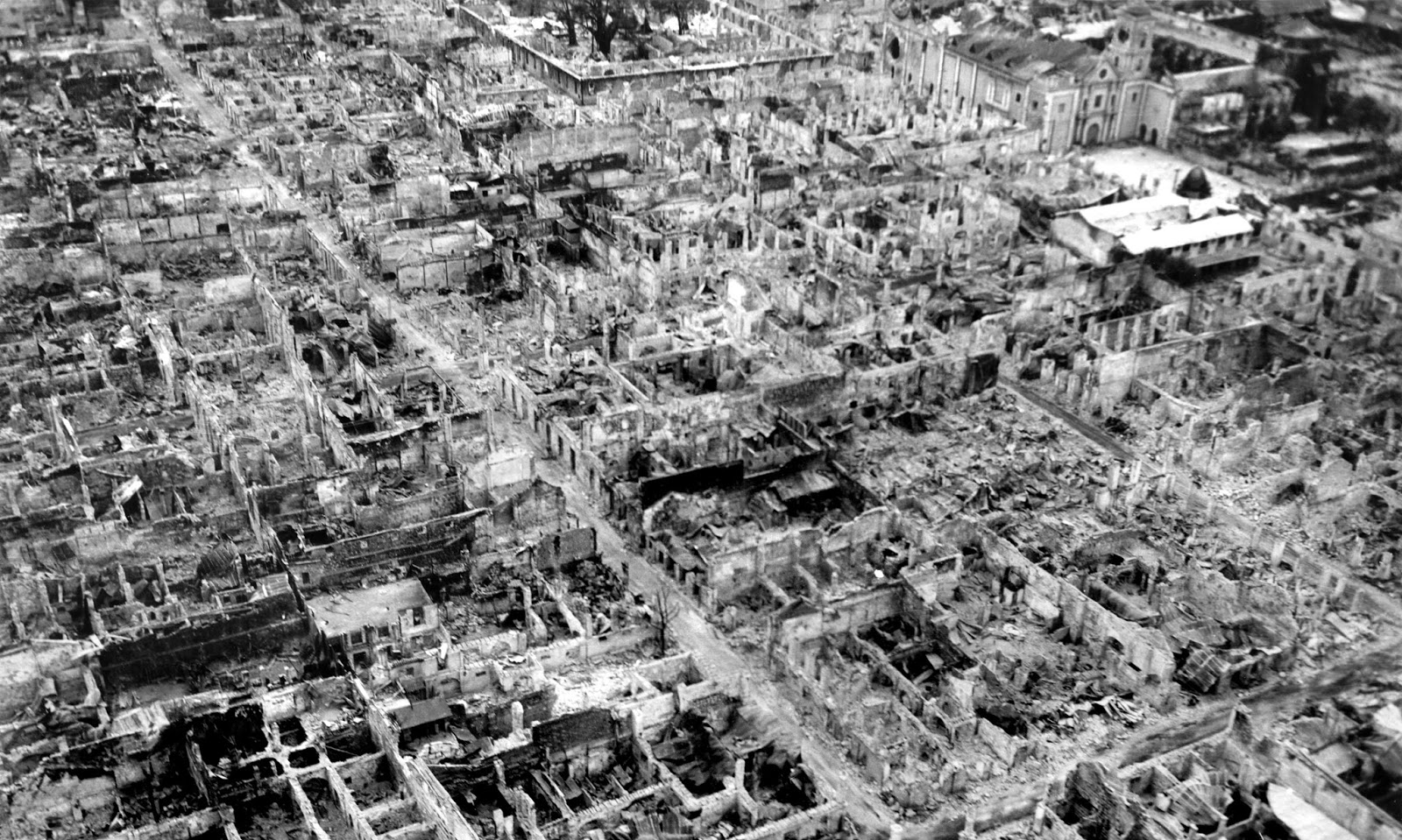
The San Agustin Church (top right) is surrounded by ruins following massive aerial bombardment of the Walled City of Manila in May 1945.

During the Japanese occupation during the Second World War, San Agustin Church became a concentration camp. The Japanese troops removed the lower portion of the right front door of the church and placed sandbags on the resulting opening, turning the entrance into a makeshift machine gun post. In the final days of the Battle of Manila, hundreds of Intramuros residents and clergy were held hostage in the church by Japanese soldiers with many hostages killed during the three-week-long battle. It was the only one among seven churches of Intramuros to survive a leveling by combined American and Filipino ground forces in May 1945. While the church sustained damage to its roof, the adjacent monastery was completely destroyed. In the 1970s, the monastery was rebuilt as a museum under the design of architect Angel Nakpil. The church was renovated in 2013, with its colorful façade replaced by a sedate, stone-colored one.

=== Post-WWII era ===
On September 4, 2000, the image of Our Lady of Consolation was canonically crowned with a decree of canonical coronation by Pope John Paul II. The Church launched its first pilgrim image of Our Lady of Consolation on May 1, 2023, to promote the devotion to Our Lady.

San Agustin Church and its adjacent convent, Convento de San Agustin, served as the provincial house and headquarters of the Augustinian Province of the Most Holy Name of Jesus of the Philippines of Spain ever since the province's founding in 1575 until 1901, when it was transferred to Madrid after Spain surrendered the Philippines to American forces. The provincial administration of the province was briefly brought back to Manila in 1927, after the election of Fr. Gaudencio Castrillo, O.S.A., after the church where the provincialate was located in Madrid, the Iglesia de San Benito y San Manuel, was turned over to the Augustinian Province of Spain (founded September 11, 1926) which the latter used as its own provincialate. The provincial house of the Philippine province remained in Manila until around 1934 when it was brought back to Spain, where it remained ever since until its dissolution to form the unified Spanish Province of San Juan Sahagun in 2019.

San Agustin Church is currently administered by the Augustinian friars of the Province of the Most Holy Name of Jesus of the Philippines, a new Augustinian province in the country which took the same name of the old Philippine Province. It was founded in 2019 following the dissolution of the old Philippine Province and the merger of the four Augustinian provinces in Spain to establish the Province of San Juan Sahagun.

==== Fiesta de Intramuros ====
Fiesta de Intramuros
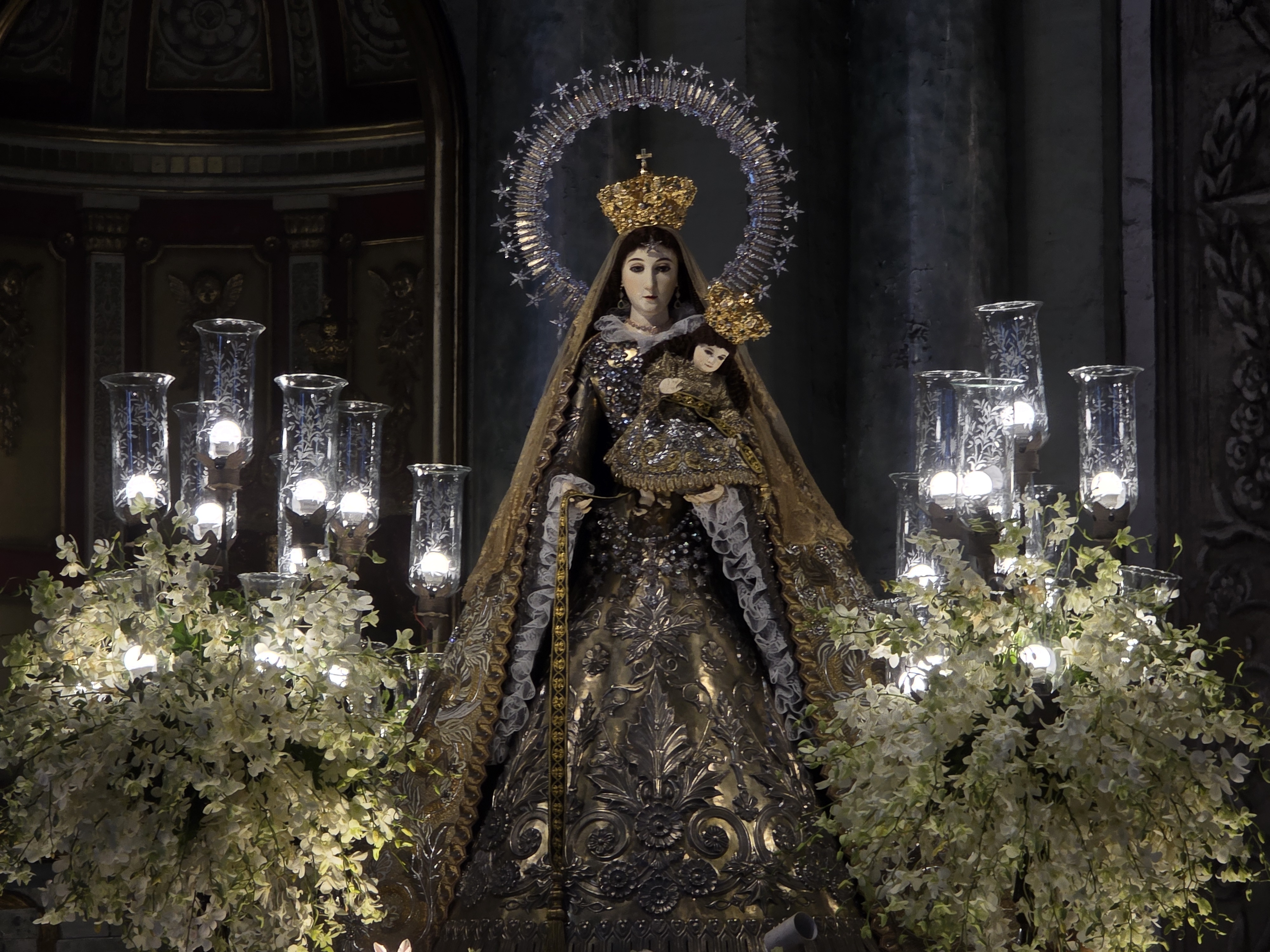
- The image of Nuestra Señora de la Consolación y Correa on her carroza during the second Fiesta de Intramuros in 2025.
- Official name: Solemnity of the Virgin of Consolation and Cincture
- Also called: Fiesta de Intramuros
- Observed by: Intramuros, Manila
- Liturgical color: White
- Type: Local / Religious / Cultural
- Significance: Feast of Our Lady of Consolation
- Celebrations: Holy Mass, processions
- Date: Second Sunday in September
- 2025 date: September 14
- 2026 date: September 13
- 2027 date: September 12
- 2028 date: September 10
- Frequency: Annual
- First time: September 8, 2024

On August 15, 2024, the Manila City Council passed a resolution formally declaring Nuestra Señora de la Consolación y Correa as patroness of Intramuros, Manila. The same resolution declared also designated the Marian title as "Queen and Protectress of the Distinguished and Ever Loyal City".

The proclamation paved the way for the first celebration of the Fiesta de Intramuros, an annual event which takes place on the second Sunday in September. It also aims to boost tourism in the area and strengthen devotion to the Virgin Mary under that title, which declined after World War II.

The Fiesta was celebrated for the first time on September 8, 2024, coinciding with the Feast of the Nativity of Mary.

== Architecture ==
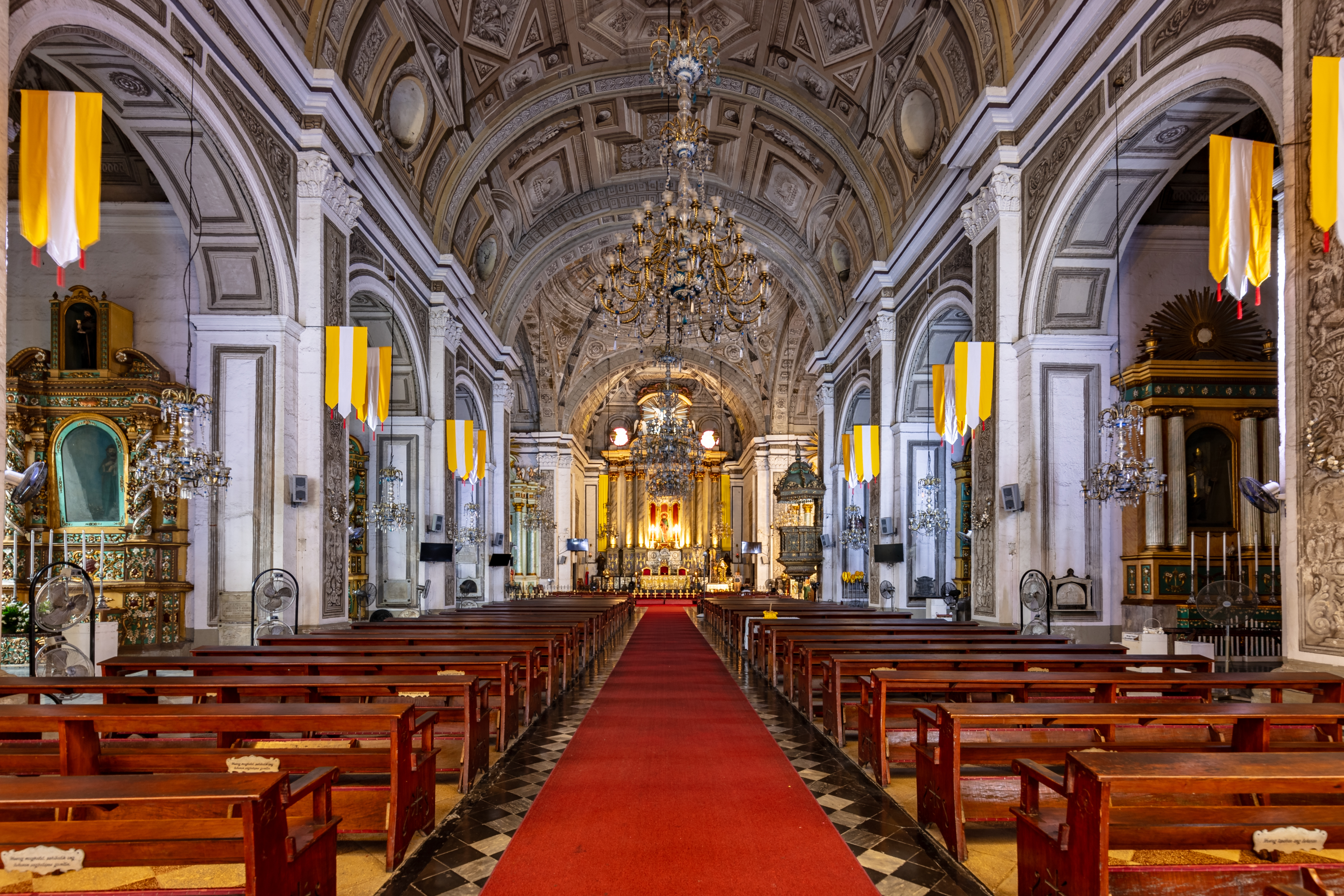
Church interior in 2023

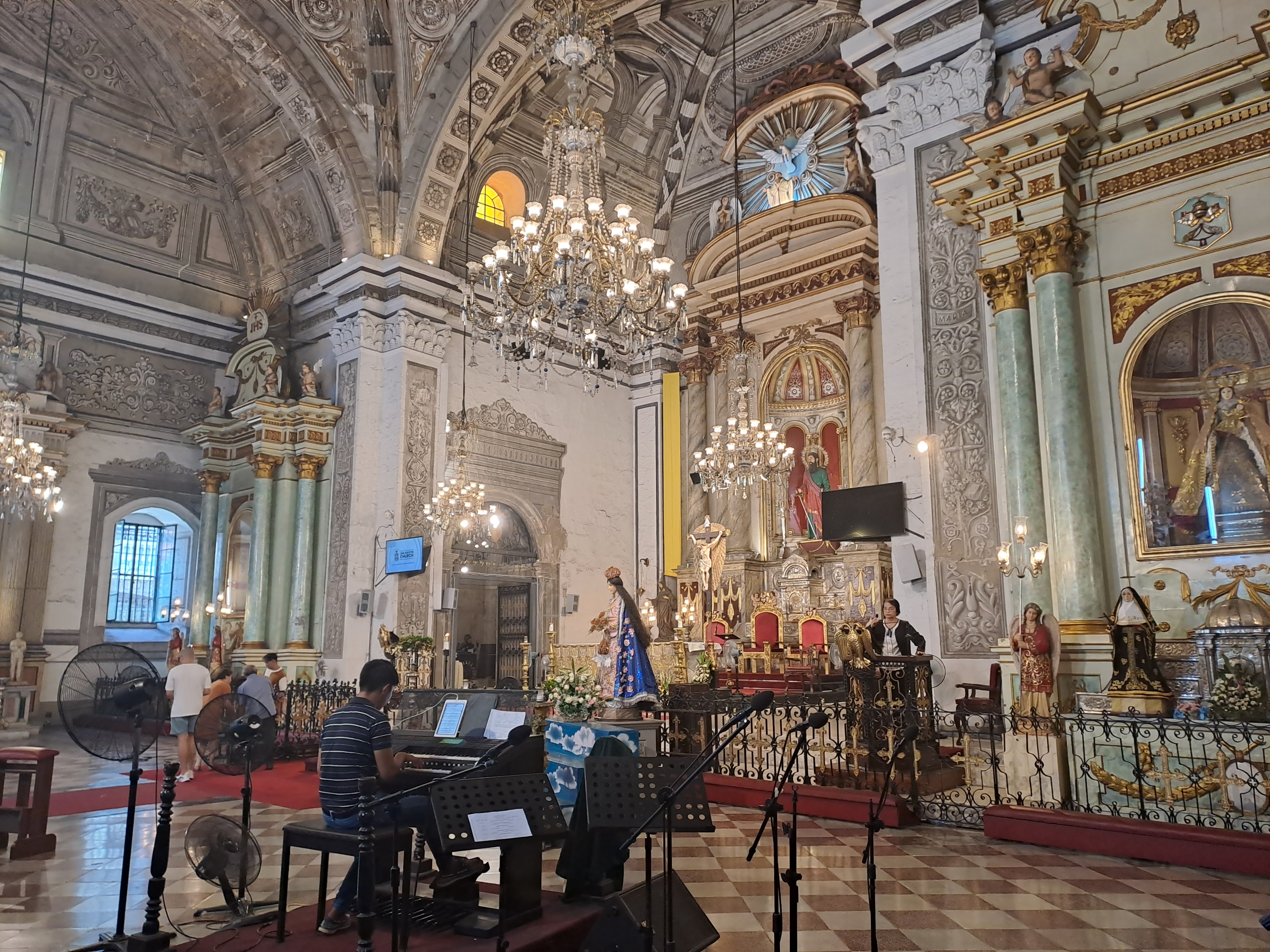
Interior from the right semitransept

San Agustin Church is patterned after some of the magnificent temples built by the Augustinians in Mexico. The present edifice was built in 1587, and completed, together with the monastery, in 1604. The atmosphere is medieval since "both church and monastery symbolize the majesty and equilibrium of a Spanish golden era".

The massive structure of the church is highlighted by the symmetry and splendor of the interiors (painted by two Italians who succeeded in producing trompe-l'œil) – the profile of the mouldings, rosettes and sunken panels which appear as three-dimensional carvings, a baroque pulpit with the native pineapple as a motif, the grand pipe organ, the ante-choir with a 16th-century crucifix, the choir seats carved in molave with ivory inlays of the 17th century and the set of 16 huge chandeliers from Paris.

A 2022 online study conducted by home services website Angi found out that the church is the "most beautiful building in the Philippines".

== Famous burials ==
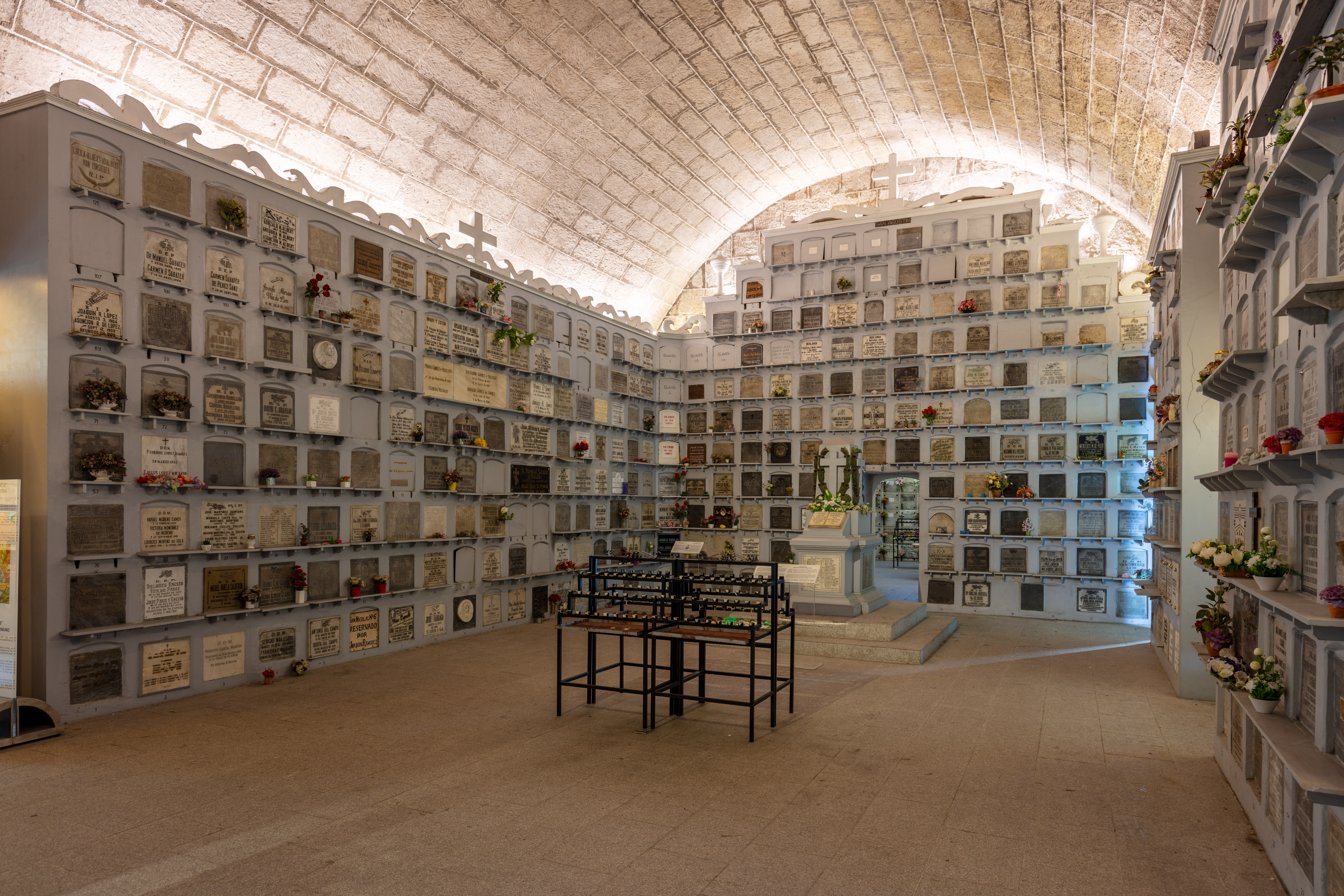
Crypts underneath the San Agustin church convent

The church, as in its custom in its heyday, contained niches for burials of bones and remains. The following are notable burials within the premises of the church.

- Miguel López de Legazpi
- Juan de Salcedo
- Guido de Lavezaris
- Juan Luna
- Blessed Pedro Zuñiga
- Francisco Alonso Liongson
- Benito Natividad
- Manuel Araullo
- Hermenegildo Cruz
- Manuel Earnshaw
- Teodoro Agoncillo
- Chit Estella
- Margarita Róxas de Ayala
- Maria Orosa

== Heritage threats ==
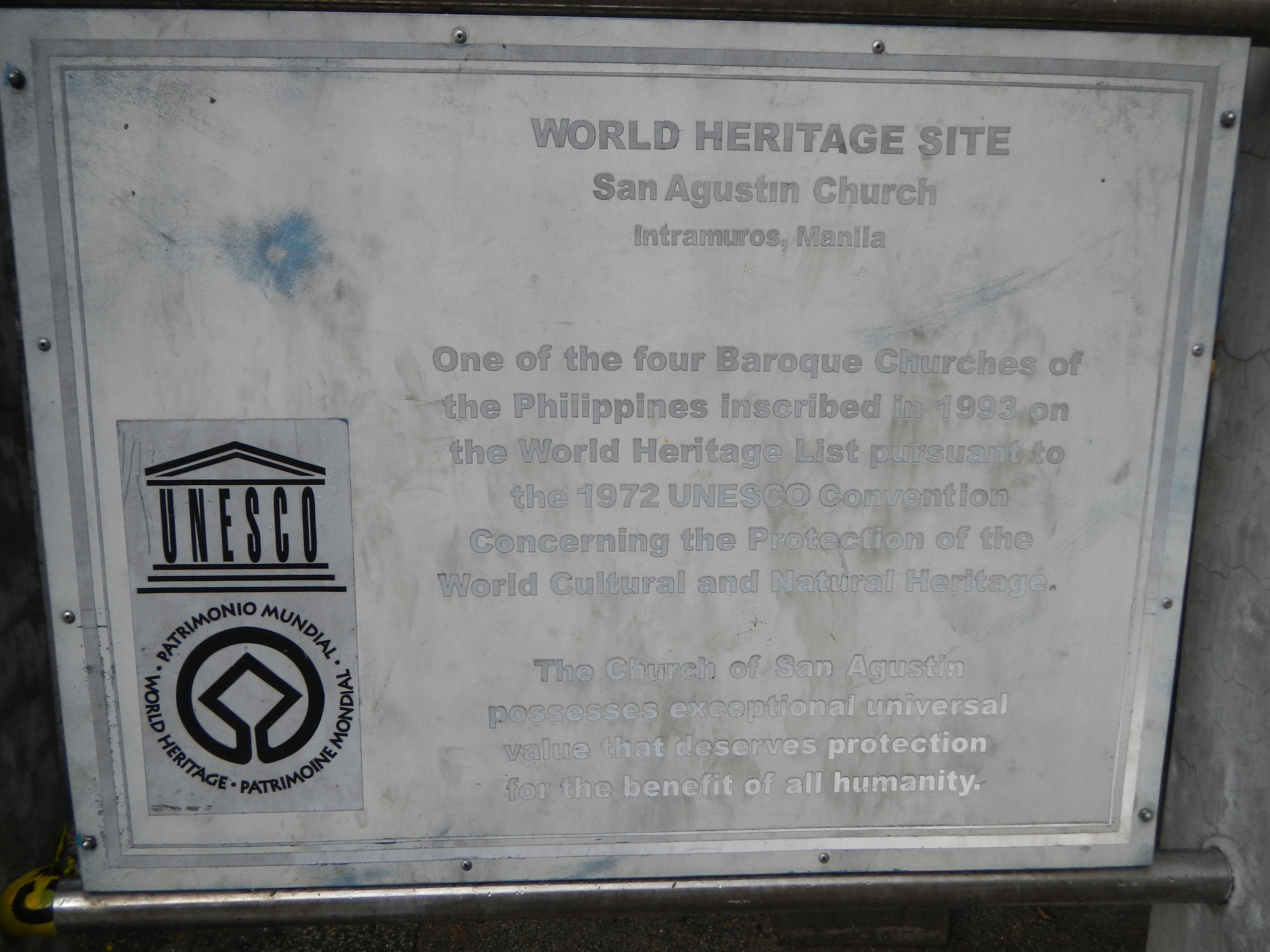
UNESCO World Heritage Site plaque

Although about 550 meters (1,800 ft) away from San Agustin Church, the Binondo–Intramuros Bridge (which opened in 2022) is believed to have encroached on the buffer zone prescribed for church, which includes the walls of Intramuros and the immediate areas outside. However, the national government argues that the bridge will have no direct physical or visual impact to the San Agustin Church, owing to its remote distance and the number of taller structures between the bridge and the church.

So far, the World Heritage Convention (WHC) has identified several potential indirect and long-term impacts to the church. WHC noted that the church could be impacted by more ground vibration due to vehicular traffic, and air and noise pollution. Moreover, the bridge would have a direct visual impact on the overall setting and sense of place of the property, including Intramuros' fortified wall, as well as the Maestranza strip and Plaza México, the visual corridor of the Pasig River, and the underlying remains of Baluarte de Santo Domingo. To mitigate the situation, it was recommended to the national government to reconsider the bridge's and location, convert the surrounding roads of the church into pedestrian areas, conduct structural assessment of the church, and adapt the design of the bridge to the character of Intramuros.

San Agustin Church was collectively declared as a UNESCO World Heritage Site in 1993, together with Paoay Church in Ilocos Norte, Santa Maria Church in Ilocos Sur, and Miag-ao Church in Iloilo. In April 2019, before the bridge construction, the National Commission for Culture and the Arts allayed fears that the three other churches could be removed from the World Heritage Site list if San Agustin Church is delisted.

== See also ==
- Architecture of the Philippines
- Spanish Baroque architecture
