= Plaza de España =

Plaza de España (Square of Spain) may refer to:

== In Spain ==
- Plaça d'Espanya, Barcelona in Barcelona
- Plaça d'Espanya (Palma) in Palma, Mallorca
- Plaza de España, Madrid in Madrid
- Praza de España (Pontevedra) in Pontevedra
- Plaza de España (Santa Cruz de Tenerife) in Santa Cruz de Tenerife
- Plaza de España, Seville in Seville
- Plaza de España (Cádiz) in Cádiz
- Praza de España (A Coruña) in A Coruña
- Plaza de España (Las Palmas) in Las Palmas
- Plaça d'Espanya (Valencia) in Valencia
- Plaza de España (Zaragoza) in Zaragoza

== Elsewhere in Europe ==
- Piazza di Spagna in Rome, Italy
- Praça de Espanha, Lisbon in Lisbon, Portugal
- Piața Spaniei in Bucharest, Romania

== Outside of Europe ==
- Plaza España (Concepción) in Concepción, Chile
- Plaza de España (Santo Domingo) in the Zona Colonial in Santo Domingo, Dominican Republic
- Plaza de España (Manila) in Manila, the Philippines
- Plaza de España (Hagåtña) in Hagåtña, Guam
- Plaza de España (Miami) in South Beach, Miami Beach, Florida, United States

== See also ==
- Plaza España metro station (disambiguation)
- List of city squares § Spain
