= Plaza España metro station =

Plaza España metro station may refer to:

- Plaza de España-Noviciado (Madrid Metro) in Madrid
- Plaça Espanya metro station in Barcelona
- Plaça d'Espanya, a Metrovalencia station

== See also ==
- Plaza de España (disambiguation)
