= Piața Spaniei =

Square in Bucharest, Romania

Coordinates: 44°26′44.86″N 26°6′28.78″E

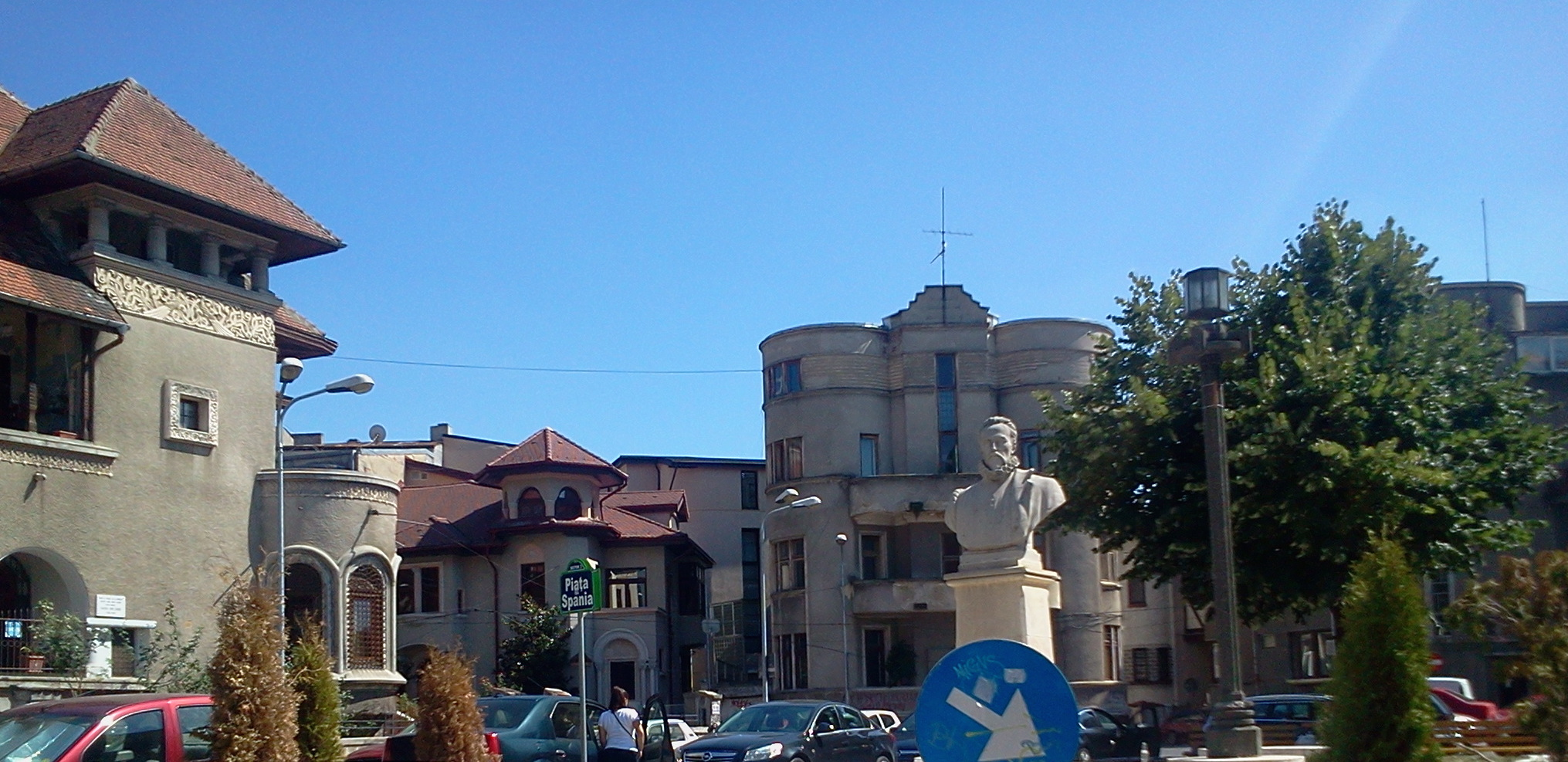
Piața Spaniei with bust of Cervantes

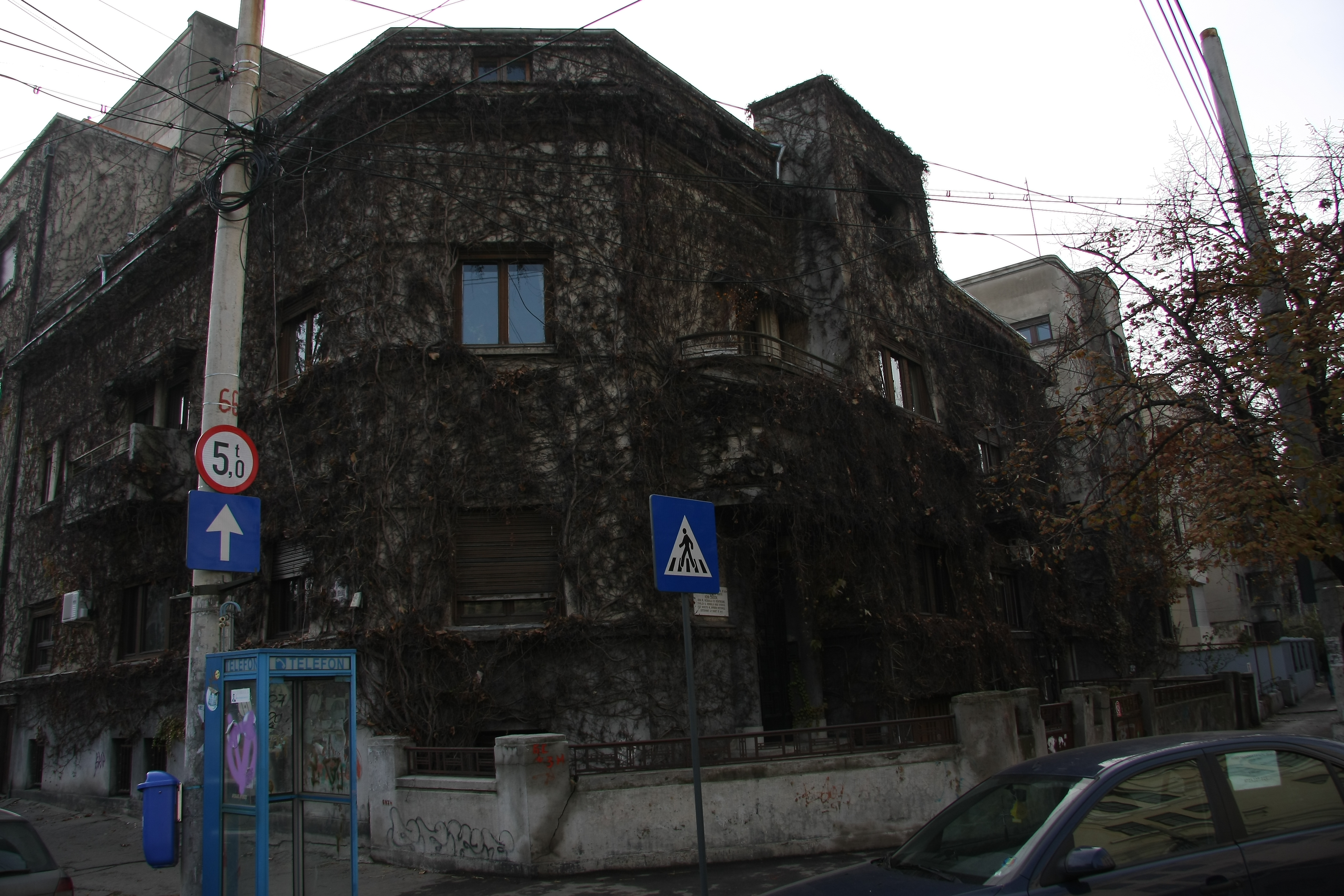
The Henri Cihoski villa

Piața Spaniei ("Spanish Plaza") is a small square in Sector 2, Bucharest, near Park Ioanid and Grădina Icoanei. In the middle of the square there is a bust of Miguel de Cervantes, the famous Spanish writer.

The Spanish Plaza lies next to Dacia Boulevard; it is connected to the nearby Gheorghe Cantacuzino Plaza by Dumbrava Roșie Street.

The villa built in 1934 by architect Alexandru Săvulescu for General Henri Cihoski lies at the corner of Piața Spaniei with Dacia Boulevard.

== See also ==
- Plaza de España
