= Plaza de España (Manila) =

Open space in Intramuros, Manila, Philippines

- Public square
- {{{other_names}}}
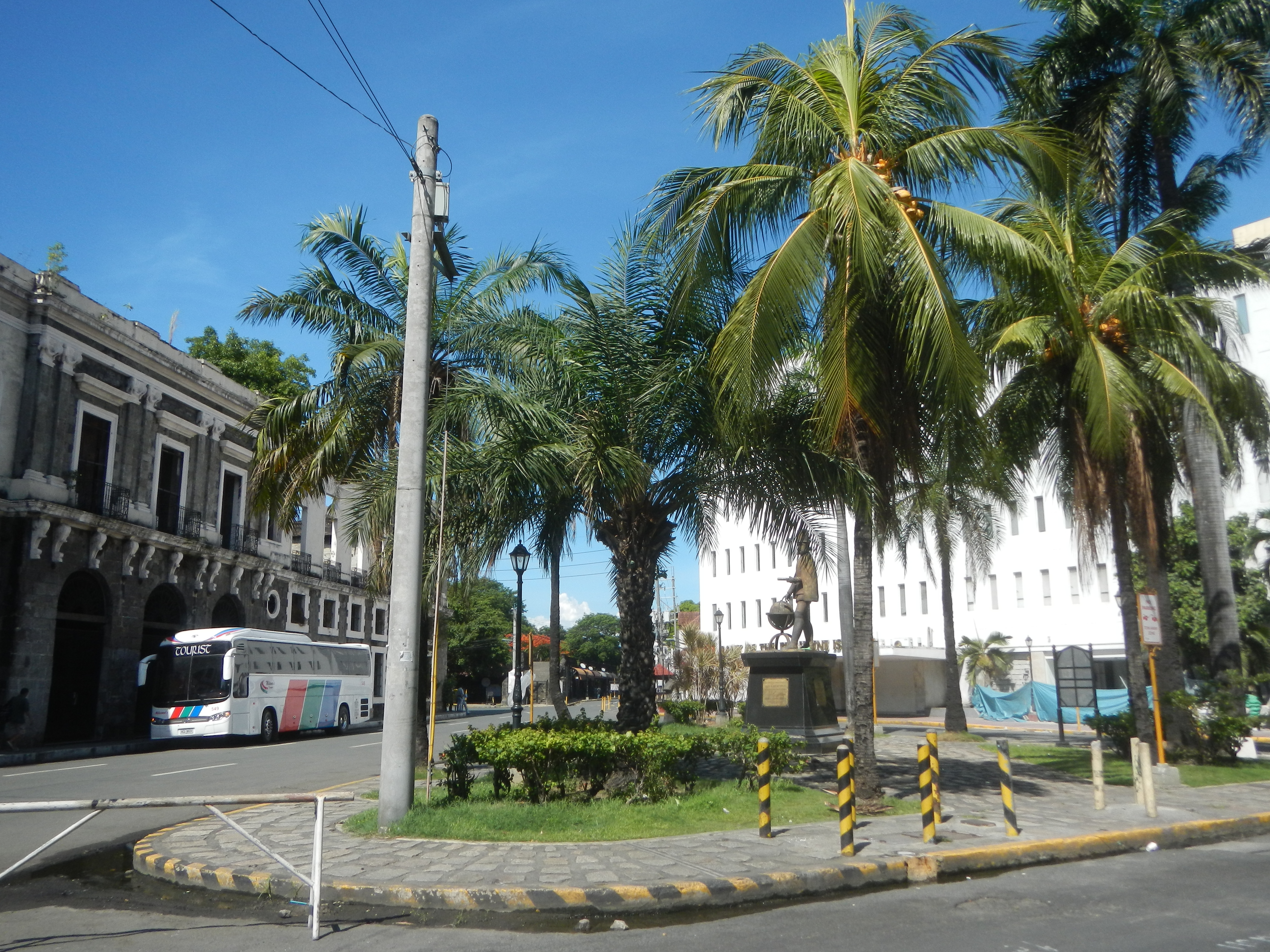
- Plaza de España is dominated by the statue of King Philip II at the center, with the ruins of the Aduana Building in close proximity.
- Location: Andrés Soriano Avenue, Muralla and Solana Streets, Intramuros; Manila, Philippines
- Interactive map of Plaza de España
- Coordinates: 14°35′36″N 120°58′28″E

Plaza de España, also known as Plaza España, is a public square in Intramuros, Manila, Philippines, formed by the intersection of Andres Soriano Avenue, Solana Street and Muralla Street. It is a triangular "square" which features a monument to King Philip II of Spain, after whom the Philippines was named. The square is one of 47 parks and plazas in the City of Manila maintained by the city's Park Development Office in partnership with the Intramuros Administration. It is surrounded by the Aduana Building, the BPI Intramuros building, which replaced the old Santo Domingo Church destroyed during World War II, and the Banco Filipino condominium building built on a portion of the old Ayuntamiento de Manila.

In the early Spanish colonial period, the square was simply Plaza Aduana. In 1897, it was renamed to Plaza de los Martires de la Integridad de la Patria or simply Plaza de Martires after the Spanish soldiers who died during the Philippine Revolution. It was in 1902, during the American colonial period, that the plaza came to be known by its present name.

The Intramuros Administration began restoring the plaza in 1982. In 1998, the monument to King Philip II was erected in the plaza's center. It was inaugurated in 2000 during the state visit of Queen Sofía as part of the celebration of the Philippine Centennial.

== See also ==
- Philippines–Spain relations
