= Aduana Building =

Historic building in Manila, Philippines

- La Intendencia
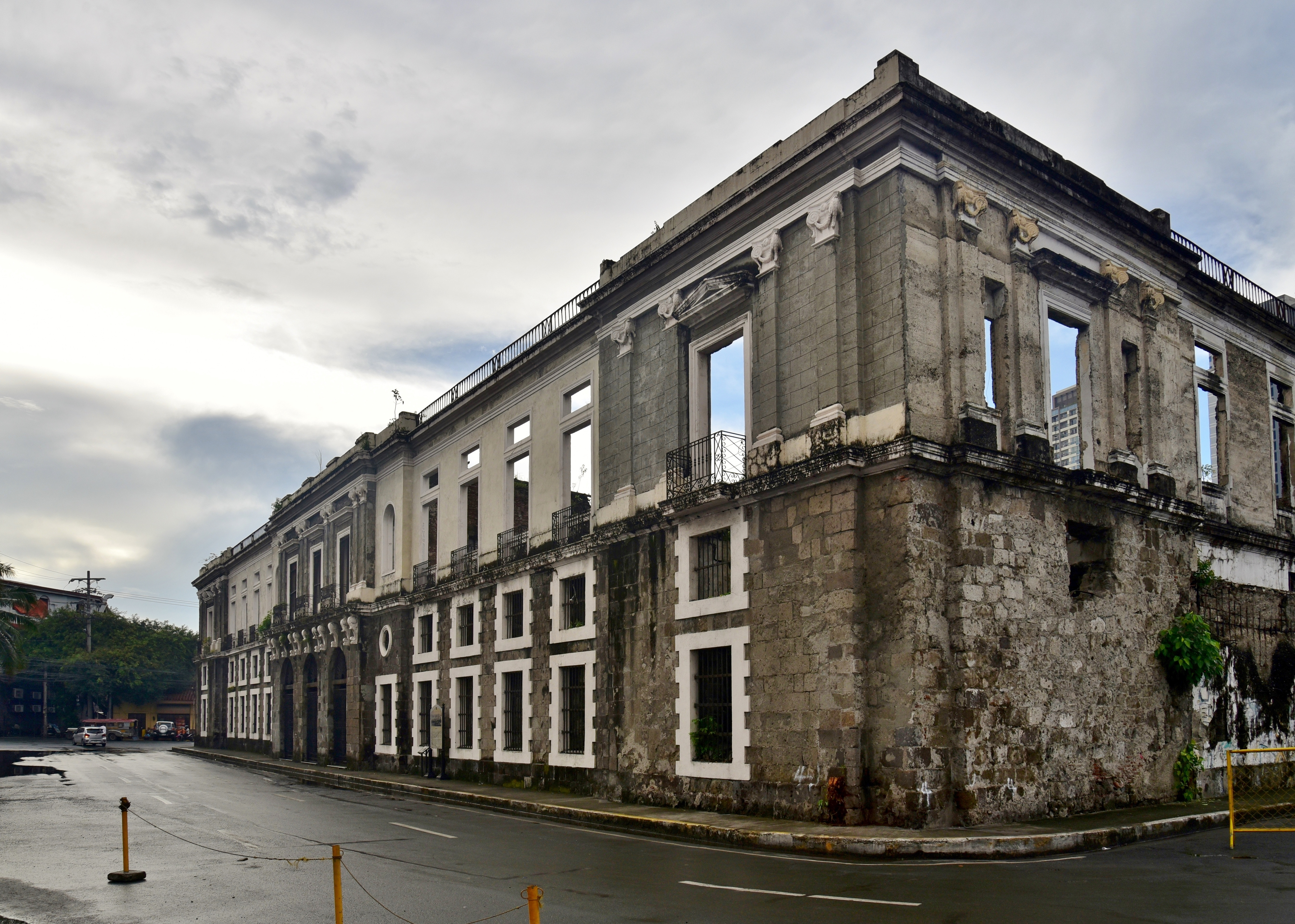
- The Aduana Building, also known as the Intendencia
- Alternative names: Custom House

General information
- Type: Government building
- Architectural style: Neoclassical
- Location: Andres Soriano Avenue corner Muralla Street, Intramuros, Manila, Philippines
- Coordinates: 14.5939°N 120.9745°E
- Current tenants: National Archives of the Philippines Commission on Elections (former); Central Bank of the Philippines (former); Intendencia General de Hacienda (former) Customs Office (former)
- Construction started: 1823, 1874
- Completed: 1829, 1876
- Renovated: 2021–present
- Destroyed: 1863 Earthquake; 1941 World War II; 1945 Battle of Manila
- Owner: National Archives of the Philippines

Technical details
- Material: Adobe stones

Design and construction
- Architect: Tomas Cortes

The Aduana Building (Aduana de Manila or Manila Customs House), also known as the Intendencia, was a Spanish colonial structure in Manila, Philippines, that housed several government offices through the years. It is located in front of the BPI Intramuros (formerly the site of the old Santo Domingo Church) at Plaza España, Soriano (Aduana) Ave. corner Muralla St. in Intramuros.

== Architecture ==
This two-storey governmental structure follows a Neo-Classical tradition, with an emphasized horizontality and symmetrical form, particularly on the design of its façade. The central bay had three arched entrances and two principal staircases built around the two atriums. The rectangular fenestration on the upper most story were decorated with rustication. The window-like portals opening out to small balconies were framed with pilasters topped with ornate capitals and were adorned with elaborate geometrical grillework. Similar ornate grillework also decorated the main entryways in the building.

== History ==
Historical marker installed in 1935 to commemorate the building

The Aduana, or Custom House, was built in Intramuros to attract merchants to remain within its walls rather than outside of it. Records show that in 1822, a Spanish engineer Tomás Cortes took charge of the project and began its construction in 1823. Despite objections due to insufficient space for warehousing and its distance from the port, the construction continued until its completion in 1829. However, in 1863, the Aduana suffered damage from an earthquake, which led to its demolition in 1872. Reconstruction of the building was later awarded to Luis Perez Yap-Sionjue, which began in 1874 and was completed in 1876. The rebuilding of the structure was still based from the original design of Cortes but it has now housed the Custom Offices, the Civil Administration Office (Intendencia General de Hacienda), the Treasury, and the Mint House (Casa de Moneda). When the Customs transferred, the offices of the Mint House and Treasury remained in the building and was renamed as Intendencia.

In 1907, the Pontifical coronation of Nuestra Señora del Santísimo Rosario - La Naval de Manila took place in front of the Aduana Building.

In World War II, the building once again suffered damage; first from Japanese bombings in 1941 and later on from American and Filipino artillery during the Battle of Manila in 1945. The Aduana was repaired after the war and served as the offices of the Central Bank of the Philippines, the National Treasury and eventually the Commission on Elections. The building was abandoned in 1979 after it was ravaged by fire.

In 1997, the National Archives acquired the building to serve as their future office. Restoration efforts were under discussion since 2015, and reconstruction commenced in 2021. According to Google Street View imagery dated May 2022, some of the façades have been reconstructed with new stonework and paint.

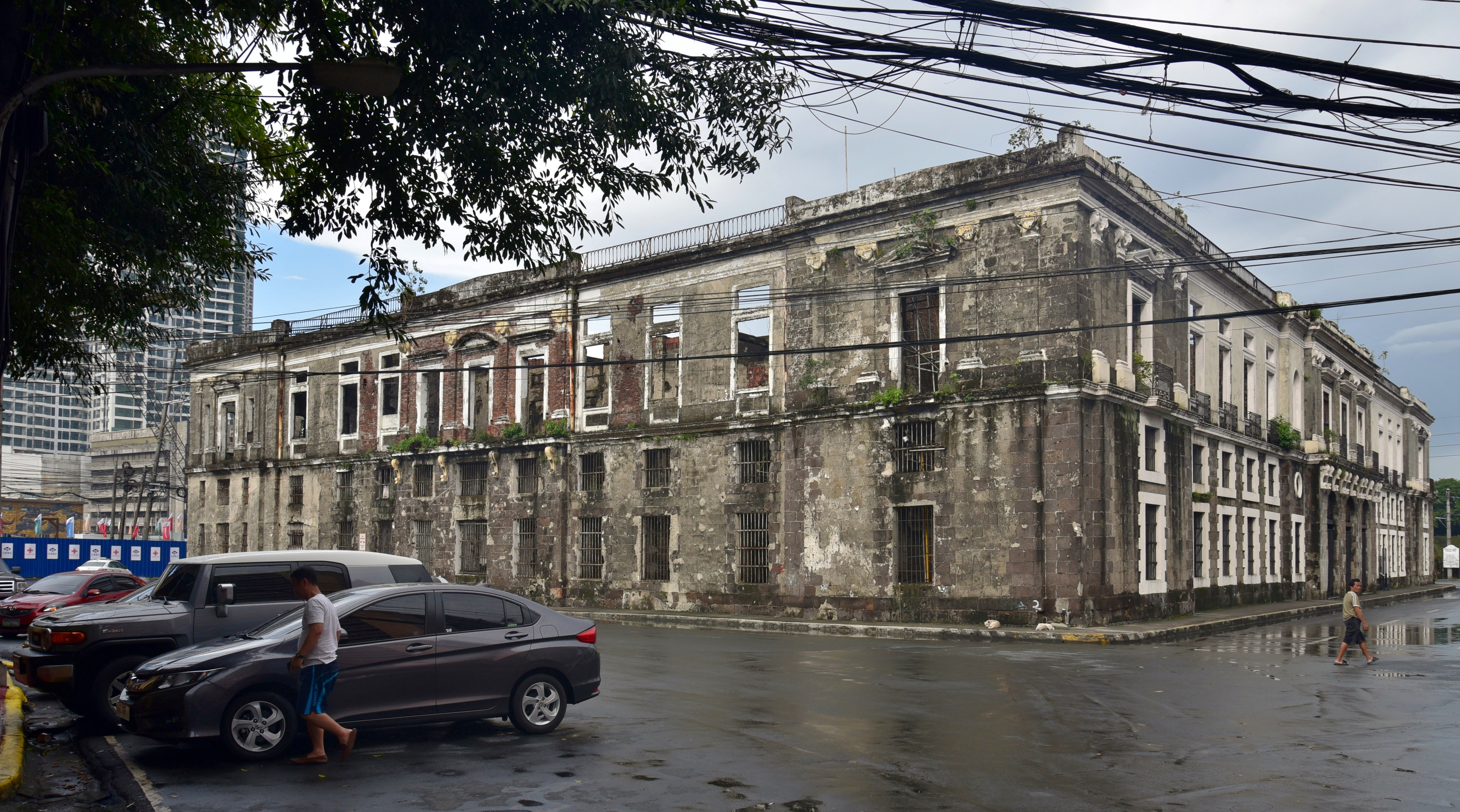
Facade of the Aduana Building in 2018

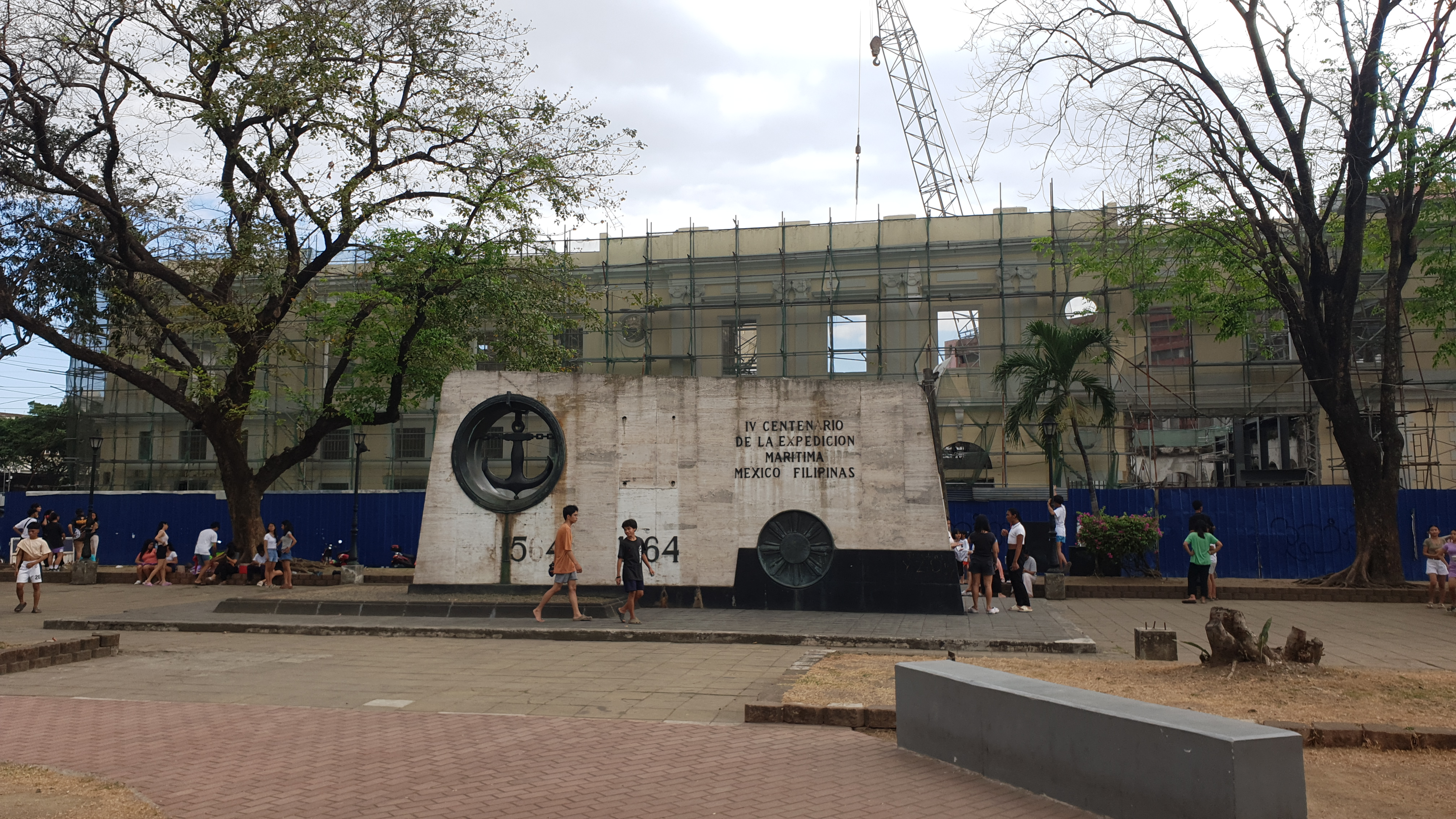
The Aduana Building behind Plaza Mexico in the process of restoration in 2024

== See also ==
- Iloilo Customs House
