= Plaza Mexico (Manila) =

Historic square in Manila, Philippines

- Public square
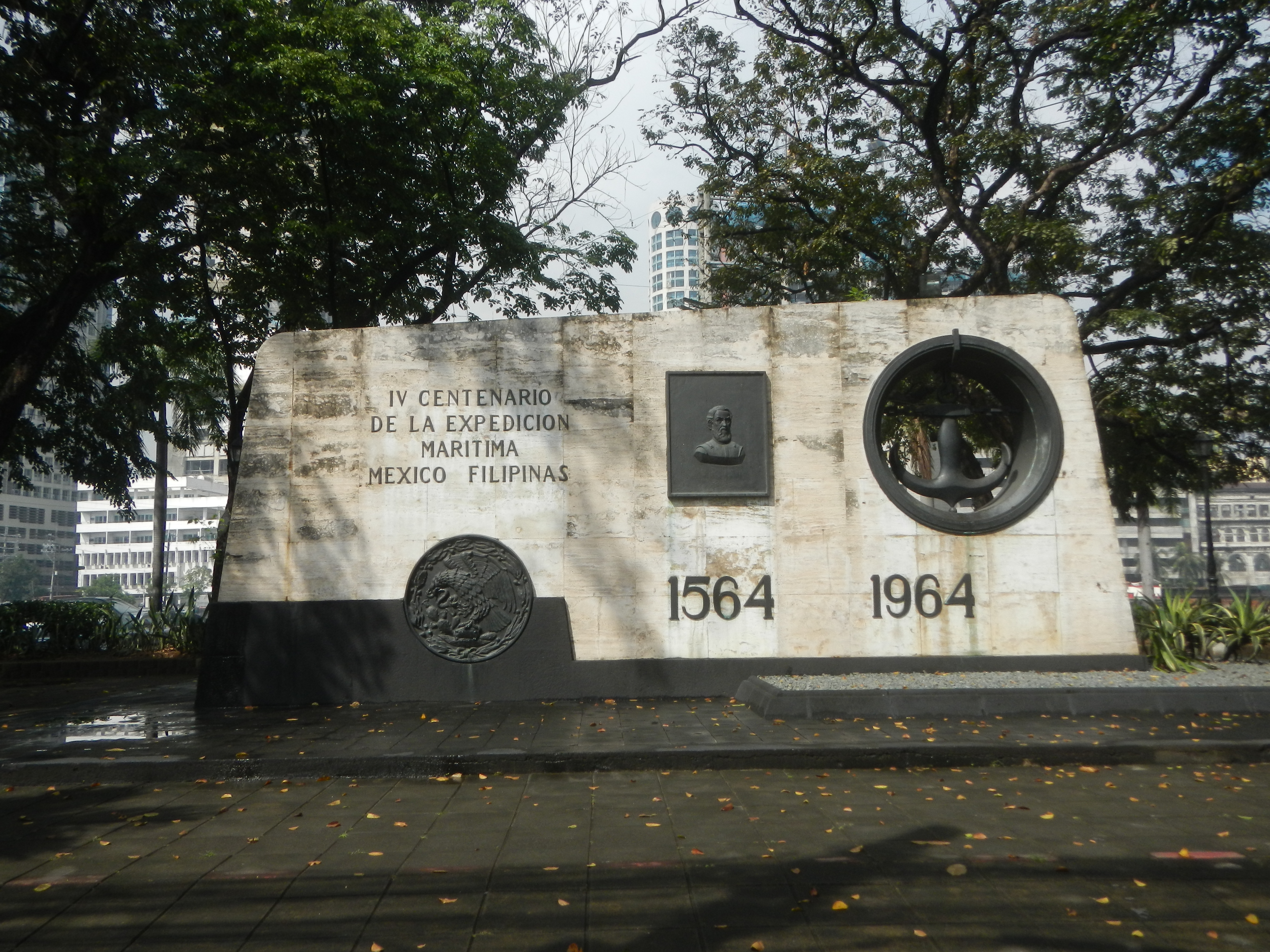
- IV Centenario de la Expedición Marítima México Filipinas memorial
- Location: Magallanes Drive, Intramuros; Manila, Philippines
- Interactive map of Plaza Mexico
- Coordinates: 14.5945°N 120.9746°E

Plaza Mexico is a historic riverside square in Manila, Philippines, located at the west end of Magallanes Drive and Riverside Drive in Intramuros, bordering the Pasig River in the north. It is surrounded by the Aduana Building on the south, the Bureau of Immigration Building on the east and the ruins of the Bastión de Maestranza and Puerta de Almacenes on the west. The Pasig River Ferry had a station named Plaza Mexico located northeast of the square behind the Immigration building. The square was renamed Plaza Mexico in 1964 to commemorate the 4th centenary of the expedition of Miguel López de Legazpi and Andres de Urdaneta from New Spain (Mexico) and the historic Manila-Acapulco galleon trade relations between the two nations that lasted 250 years.

Located on this square is the monument to the IV Centenary of the Mexico–Philippines Maritime Expedition donated by the Mexican Secretary of The Navy Shipyards during the 1964 celebrations of the Year of Mexican-Philippine Friendship. On the other side of the square is a statue of Adolfo López Mateos, the President of Mexico who visited the city in 1962.

== History ==
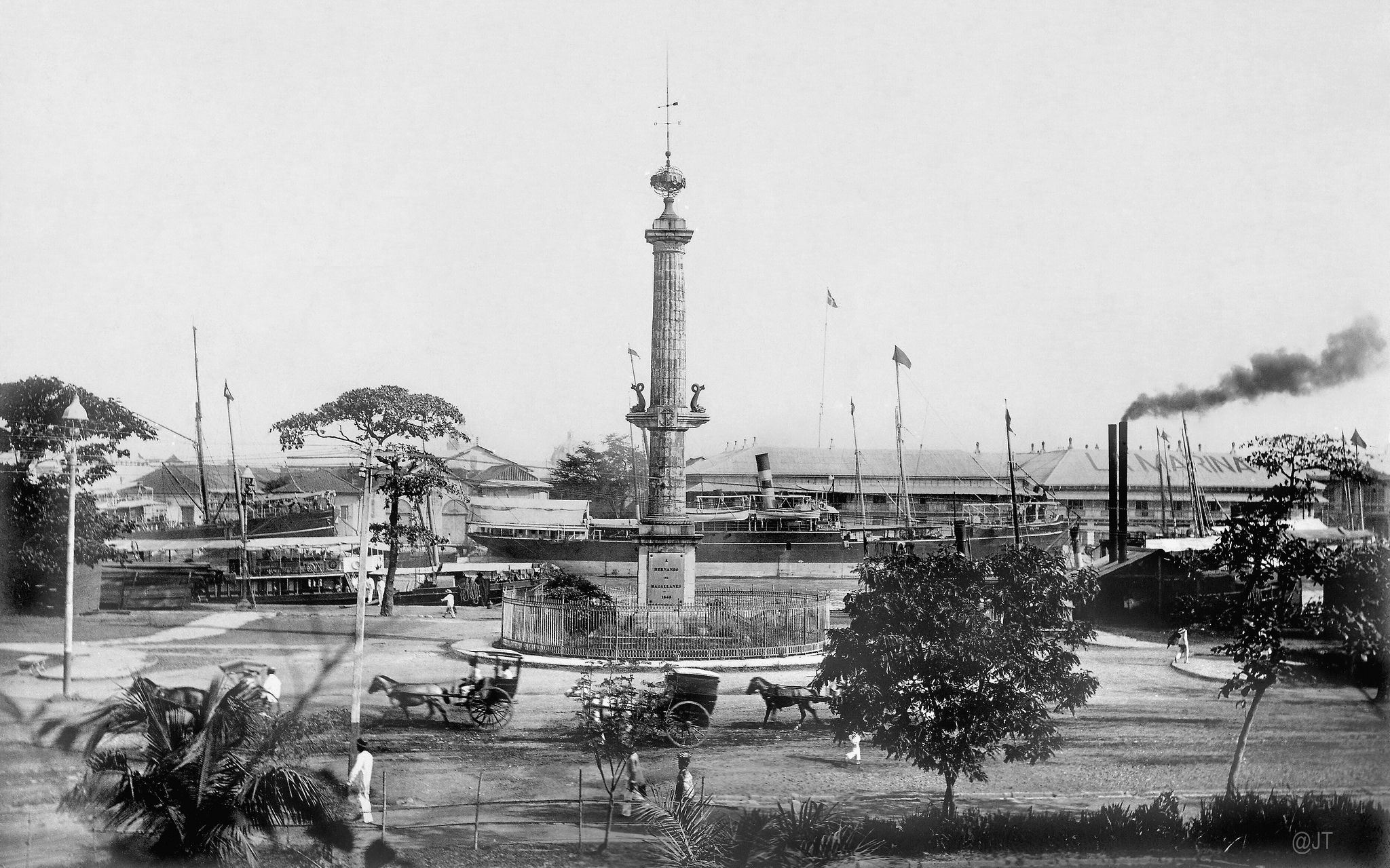
The Magallanes Monument, ca. 1900

Until 1904, the area of Plaza Mexico contained the walls of the Baluarte de Santo Domingo, which enclosed the Aduana Building and the old Santo Domingo Church. That year, the American colonial government, seeing the need to develop and expand the Pasig River docks, decided to tear down its walls and open up this side of Intramuros. The Magallanes Monument, originally erected in 1848 in the centre of the esplanade called Paseo de Magallanes to honour the Portuguese navigator who had arrived on the country's islands while in search of the Maluku Islands, was transferred to this site fronting the Aduana Building. The monument was destroyed during World War II.

From 1962 to 1964, a series of cultural exchanges between the Philippines and Mexico was held to celebrate the Year of Mexican-Philippine Friendship. This resulted in the creation of several landmarks in the city dedicated to Mexico and the Philippines' long historical and cultural ties to the Latin American country. They include Plaza Mexico and its monuments, the statue of Mexican hero Miguel Hidalgo on Bonifacio Drive, and the renaming of Taft Avenue Extension in Pasay to Mexico Road.

The Pasig River Ferry Service opened in 2007, with one of its terminus at Plaza Mexico. However, to make way for the Binondo–Intramuros Bridge, the station was demolished in 2018. As of 2025, there were plans to construct another station in Intramuros.

In 2025, with the third phase of the Pasig River rehabilitation was inaugurated at Plaza Mexico. It envisions 2,000 square meters of open activity space, connecting the Pasig River Esplanade to Fort Santiago.

== Gallery ==
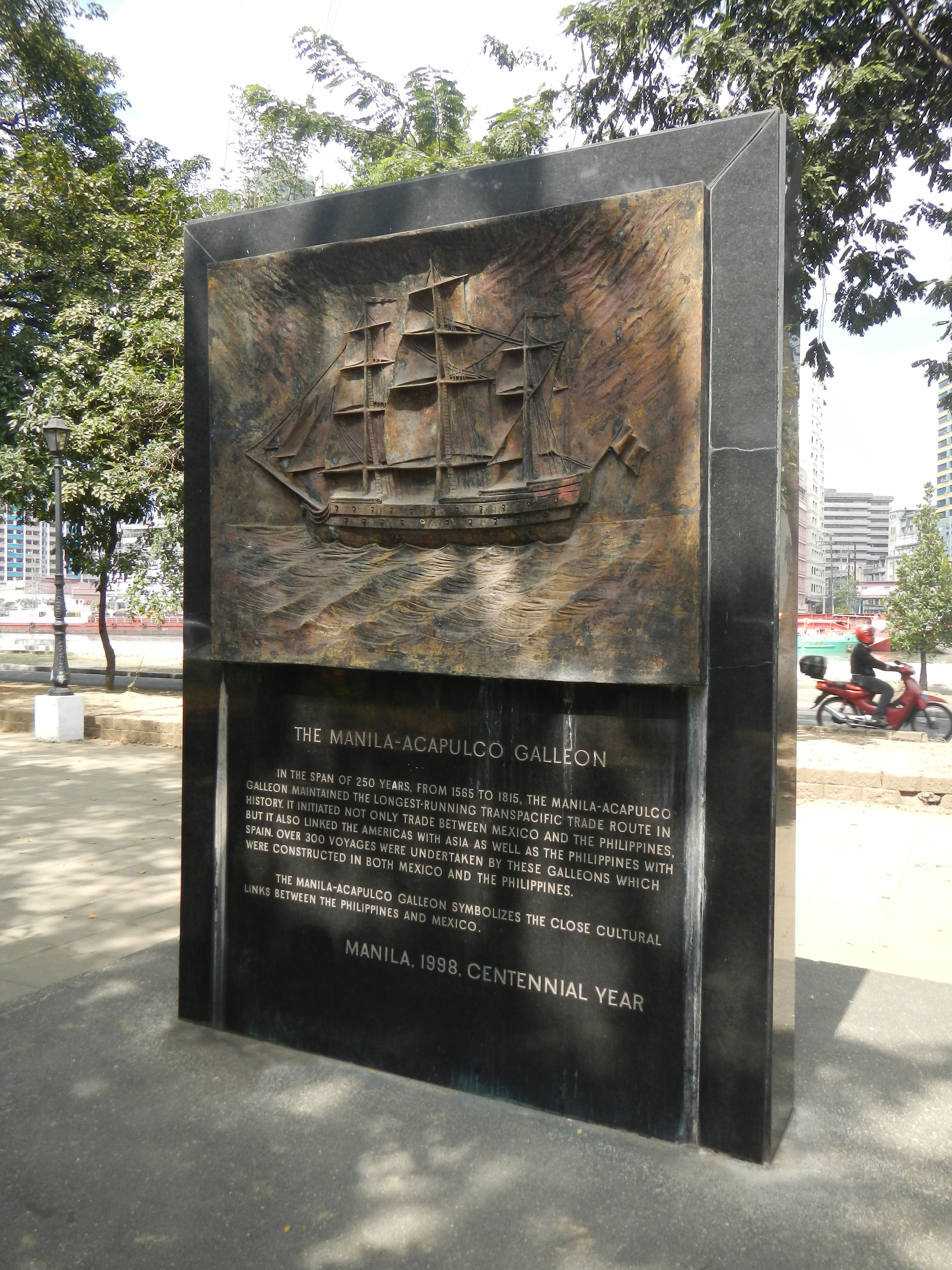
The Manila–Acapulco Galleon marker

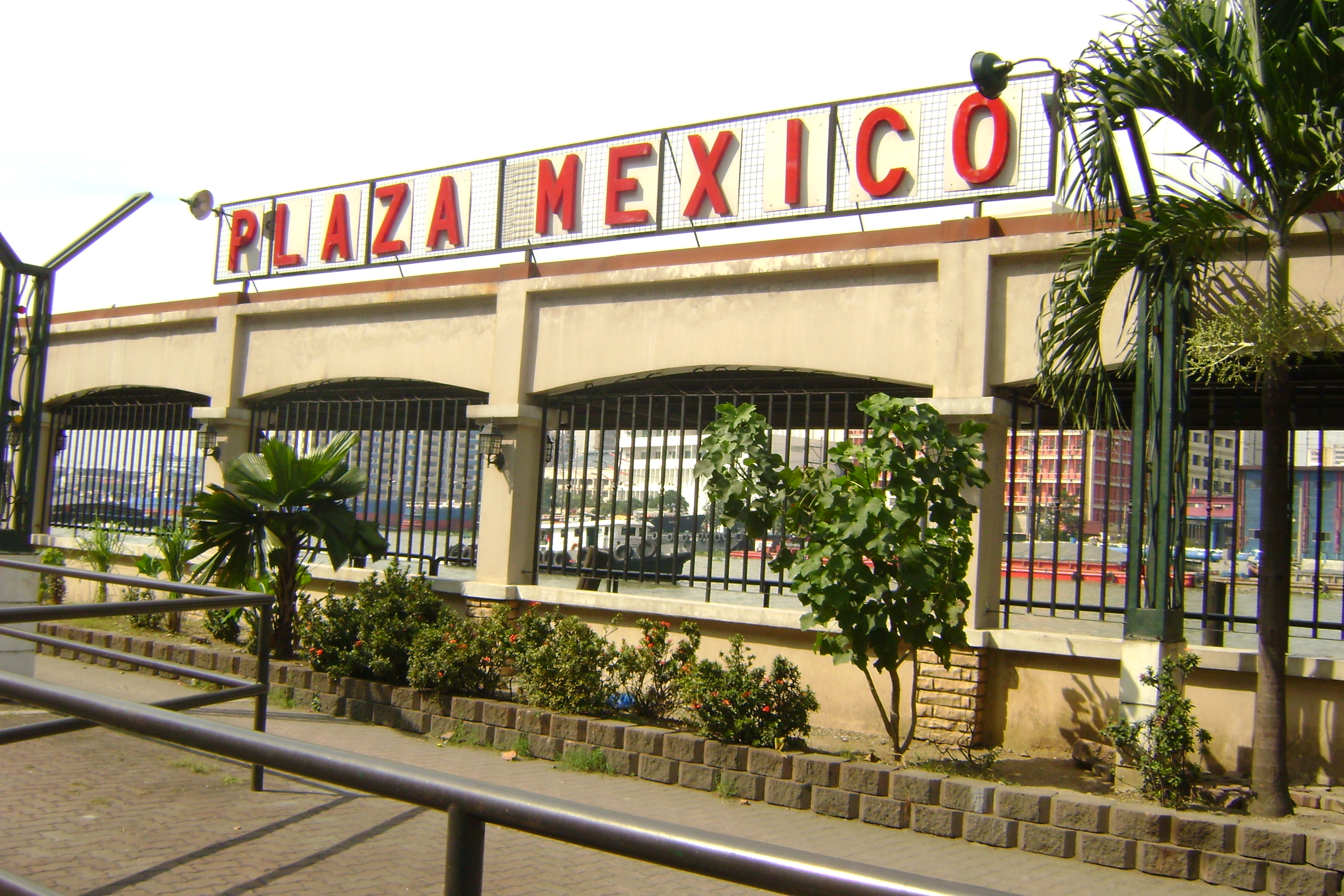
Plaza Mexico Ferry Station (2011; demolished in 2018)

== See also ==
- Media related to Plaza Mexico, Intramuros at Wikimedia Commons
- Mexico–Philippines relations
