= Boljoon Church =

Roman Catholic church in Cebu, Philippines

- Archdiocesan Shrine of Patrocinio de María Santísima
- Patrocinio de María Parish
- Dambanang Pang-Arkidyosesis sa Patrocinio de María Santísima (Cebuano)
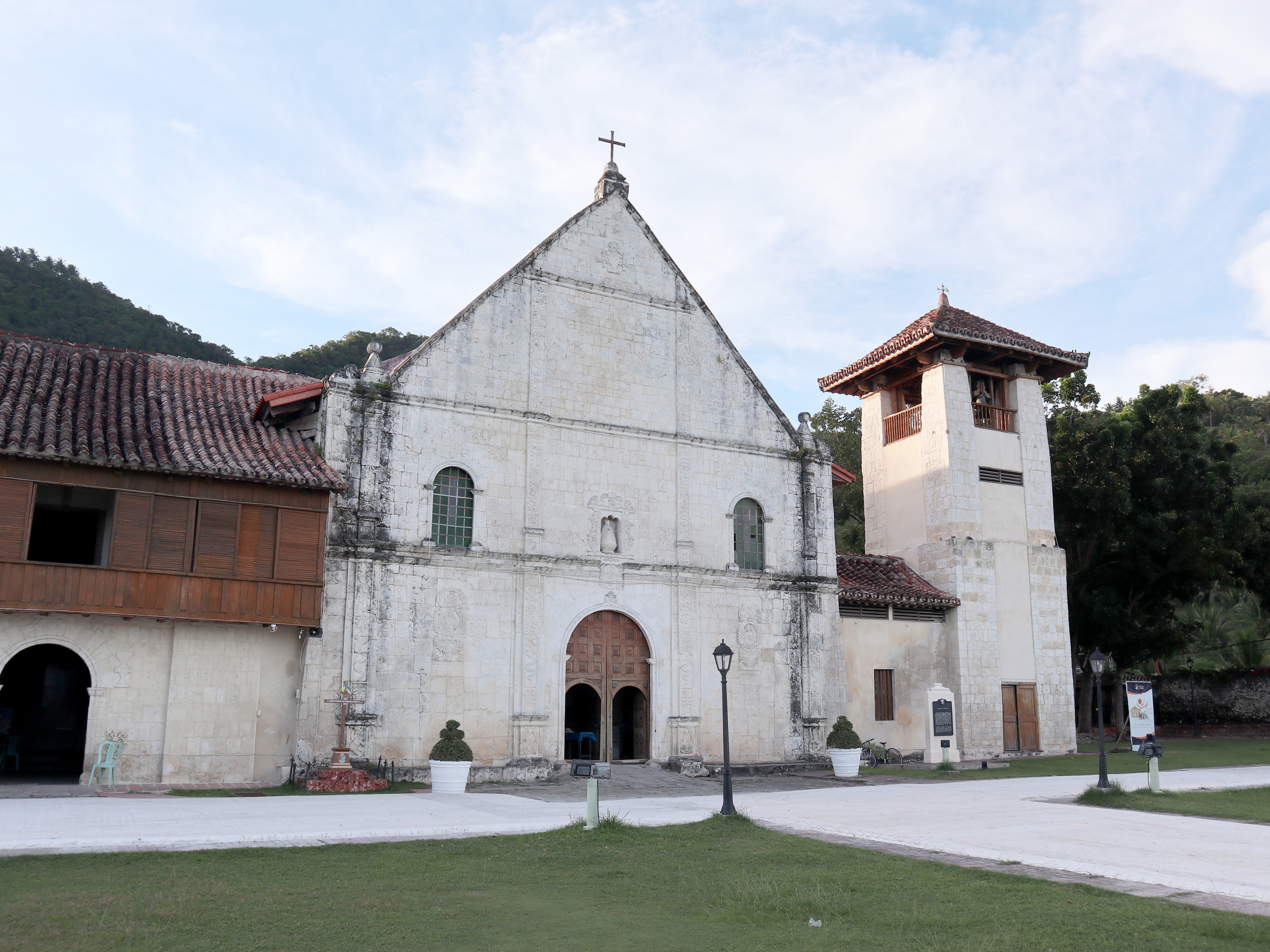
- Church façade and complex in 2023

- Location in Cebu Location in the Visayas Location in the Philippines
- 9°37′48″N 123°28′46″E
- Location: Boljoon, Cebu
- Country: Philippines
- Denomination: Roman Catholic

History
- Status: Parish church
- Dedication: Patronage of Our Lady

Architecture
- Functional status: Active
- Heritage designation: National Cultural Treasure
- Architectural type: Church building
- Style: Baroque
- Groundbreaking: 1783

Specifications
- Length: 65 metres (213 ft)
- Width: 12 metres (39 ft)
- Height: 12 metres (39 ft)

Administration
- Archdiocese: Cebu

Clergy
- Archbishop: Alberto S. Uy
- Rector: Fr. Elvin Miraflor
- Priests: Fr. Abel Bancog

National Cultural Treasures
- Official name: Boljoon Church Historical Landmark
- Designated: 2001
- Region: Central Visayas

National Historical Landmarks
- Official name: Boljoon Church
- Type: Church
- Region: Central Visayas
- Legal Basis: Resolution No. 1, s. 1999
- Marker Date: 2000

The Archdiocesan Shrine of Patrocinio de María Santísima, commonly known as Boljoon Church, is a Roman Catholic church dedicated to Our Lady of the Patronage in the municipality of Boljoon, Cebu, Philippines, under the Archdiocese of Cebu.

It has been declared a National Cultural Treasure by the National Museum of the Philippines and a National Historical Landmark by the National Historical Commission of the Philippines. It is also under consideration for the UNESCO World Heritage Sites of the Philippines as a member of the Baroque Churches of the Philippines (Extension).

== Church history ==
Boljoon (also spelled Boljo-on) began as a small Christian settlement named Nabulho. It became a visita or chapel of ease of Sialo in 1599, with the small chapel being dedicated to the Patronage of the Virgin Mary. It was elevated to a parish on October 31, 1690, by Father Francisco de Zamora, Provincial of the Augustinians, as a result of the increasing number of Christians in the area. The decision was implemented upon the appointment of Father Nicolás de la Cuadra as its first parish priest on April 5, 1692. By 1732, the Augustinians proposed to leave Boljoon owing to a shortage of priests; they eventually left on September 27, 1737. Administration of Boljoon was later transferred to the Jesuits. The Augustinians regained Boljoon in 1747, under an arrangement by which they ceded to the Jesuits the settlements of Liloan, Cotcot, and Maraling. In 1949, the Archdiocese of Cebu took charge of Boljoon. Father Zacarías Suñer was appointed as the first secular parish priest of Boljoon in 1958.

=== Architectural history ===
In 1782, earlier buildings in Boljoon were destroyed by pirates. The present church was built by Augustinian priest Father Ambrosio Otero in 1783. Construction of the church was continued by Father Manuel Cordero in 1794 and completed by Father Julián Bermejo. Father Bermejo also built other structures as part of Boljoon's defense network, such as the watchtowers and blockhouse. The church was later restored by Father Leandro Morán, the last Augustinian priest of Boljoon, who served from 1920 to 1948.

In 2007, restoration work was performed through the Boljoon Heritage Foundation, with funding from the Cebu Provincial Government.

=== Historical and cultural designations ===
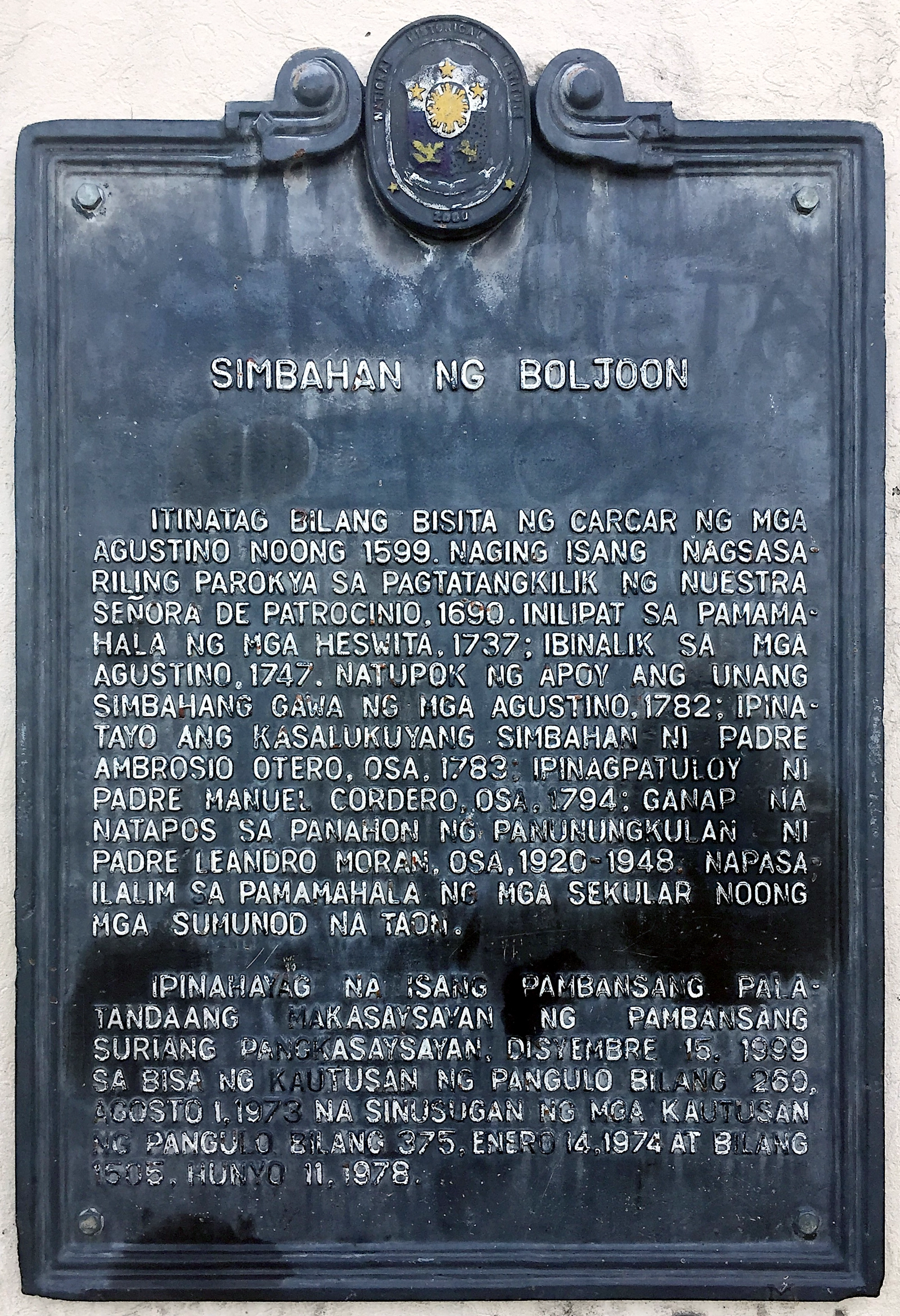
Church NHI historical marker installed in 2000

The church was declared as a National Historical Landmark by the National Historical Institute in 1999, and it was listed as a National Cultural Treasure by the National Museum of the Philippines in 2001.

It is the only church in Cebu listed as a National Cultural Treasure. It is also a candidate for UNESCO World Heritage Sites of the Philippines under the Baroque Churches of the Philippines (Extension) nomination, along with the San Pedro Apóstol Parish Church in Loboc, Bohol, La Inmaculada Concepción in Guiuan, Eastern Samar, San Matías in Tumauini, Isabela, and San Isidro Labrador in Lazi, Siquijor.

=== Theft of items ===
In the 1980s, five early 19th-century panels depicting various saints were reported missing from the church's pulpit, with varying accounts attributing it to theft or an illegal sale by the then-parish priest. Four surfaced in the private collection of Union Bank of the Philippines CEO Edwin Bautista, who donated them to the National Museum of the Philippines in February 2024. News of the donation led to demands from the Archdiocese of Cebu as well as civil officials and residents of the province for the panels to be returned. In response, the National Museum said that it was open to share the panels, adding that the donors procured the panels through legitimate means, “highlighting their commitment to ethical acquisition.” A copy of the deed of donation of the panels obtained by Rappler read that the panels should stay with the National Museum, which would hold them in perpetuity and put them on display, while acknowledging that the panels came from Boljoon Church. On April 1, the Cebu Provincial Board passed a motion to file charges against the National Museum and others who took custody over the panels. On May 8, the National Museum's board of trustees ruled in favor of returning the panels to Boljoon Church. The National Museum then formally handed over the panels to the Archdiocese of Cebu in a ceremony at the Cathedral Museum of Cebu on March 13, 2025, before these were brought to Boljoon the next day.

Aside from the panels, the church is also seeking to recover an 18th-century tabernacle which was in the possession of a certain David Kamansky, executive director of the USC Pacific Asia Museum in Pasadena, California, and was later auctioned off in 2017 by the Leon Gallery for ₱1.4 million.

== Church features ==
The church is a fortress church, built of coral stones and located on a hill near the sea. It originally served as a watchtower for Moro raids. The church is known for its original terracotta roof tiles and its distinct folk art or Filipino Baroque style seen predominantly on its choir screen and pulpit. Twenty-eight pillars support the 2-metre (6.6 ft) thick walls made of mortar and lime. Its ceiling paintings are the work of Miguel Villareal, a native of Boljoon. The three gates and the walls of the church are made of coral stones and were constructed from 1802 to 1808 under the auspices of Father Bermejo.

=== Altar ===
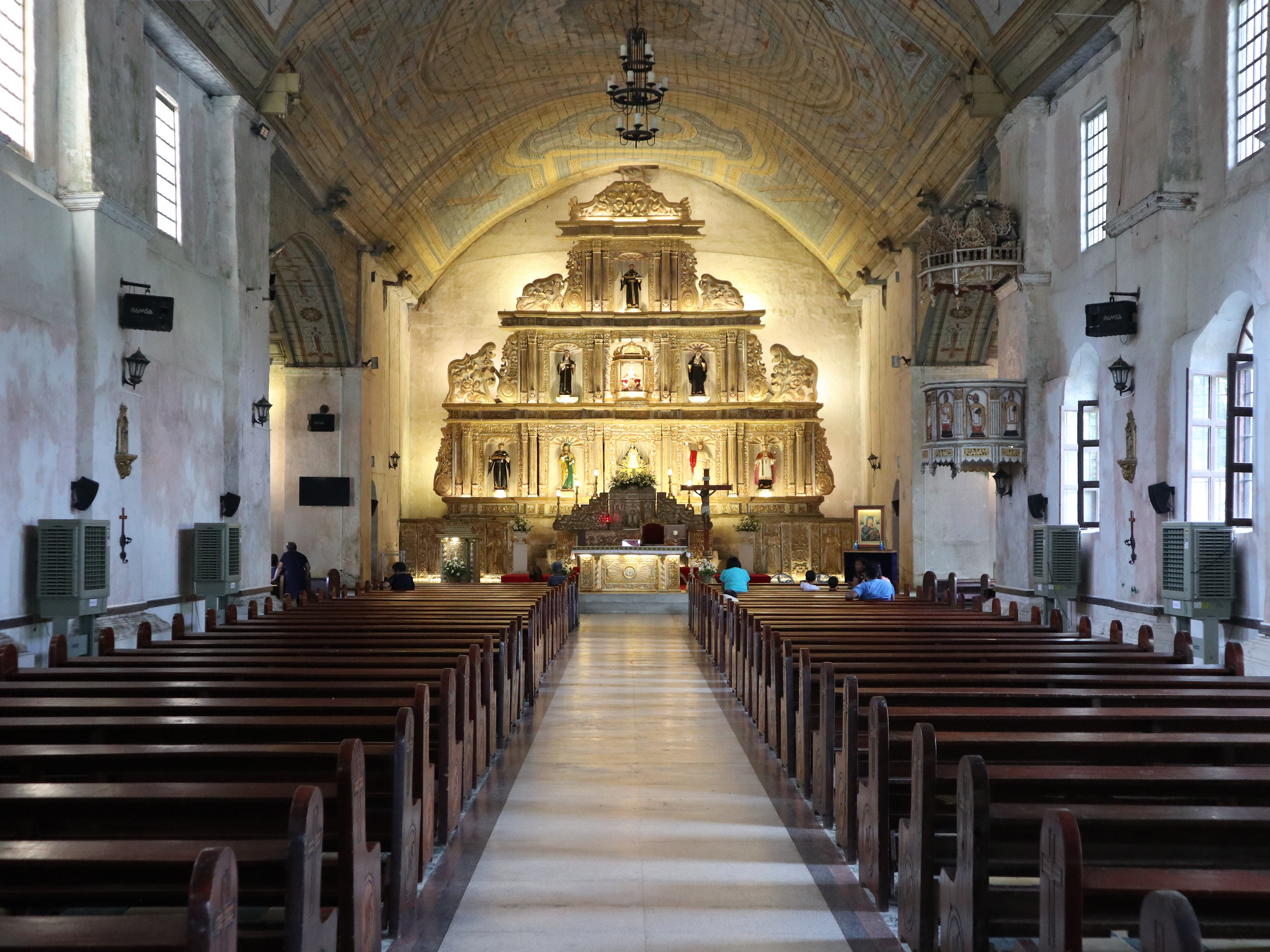
Church interior in 2023

The main retablo is in pseudo-baroque rococo with gold leaf highlights and polychrome accents. Located on the central niche of the main altar is the image of Boljoon's patron, Our Lady of the Patronage, brought by Father Bartolome de Garcia from Spain in 1599. A side chapel located on the left side of the church is also dedicated to the patron.

=== Bell tower ===
The rectangular bell tower used to have seven bells. The tower's ground floor was used as a prison cell, probably for pirates as can be assumed from the drawings of ships on the walls.

=== Church complex ===
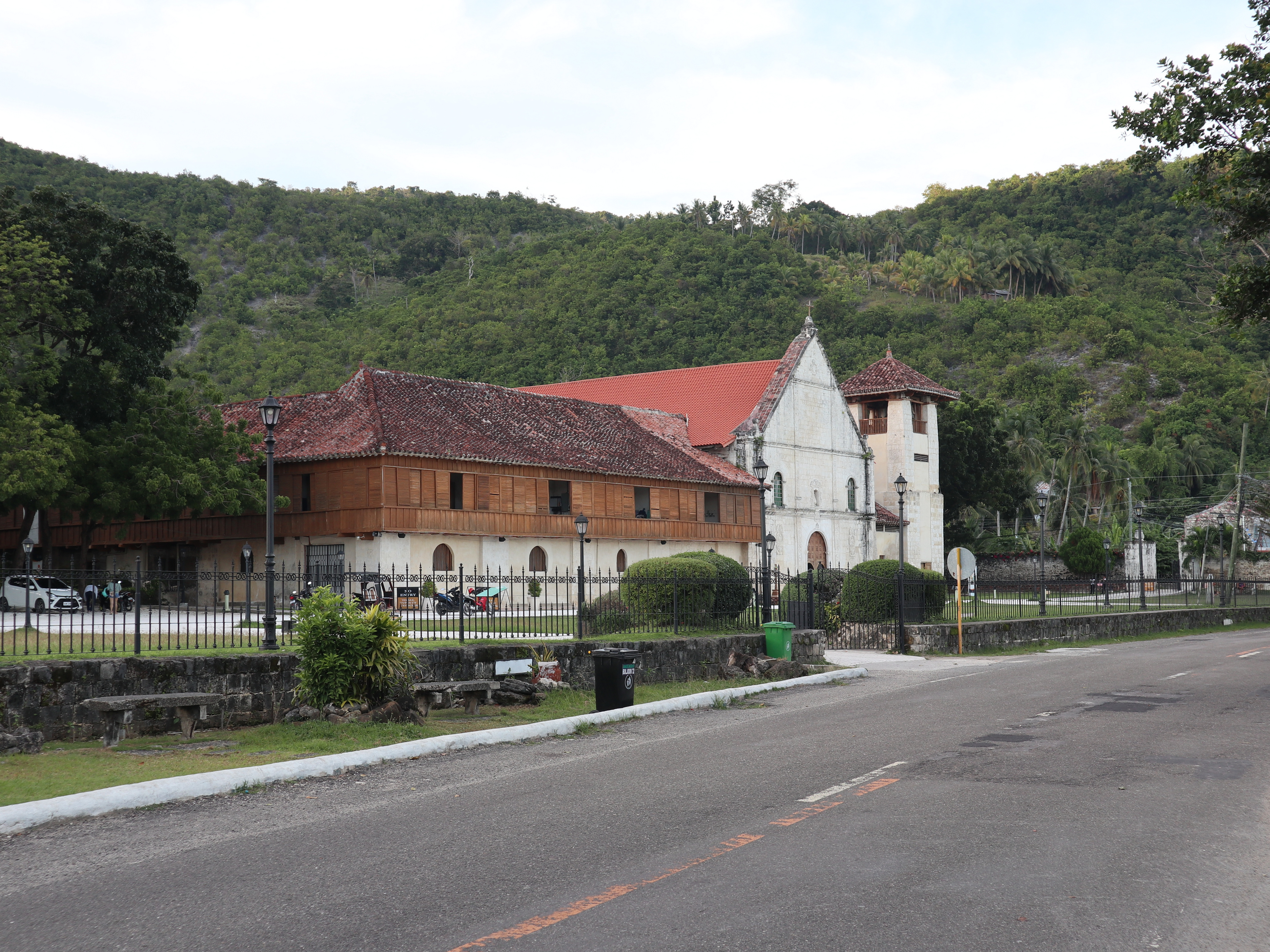
Road view of the church complex in 2023

Adjoining buildings were also built as part of the church complex and fortification.

==== Convent ====
The first floor of the church convent houses a museum containing liturgical objects such as record books, images of saints, vestments and other relics.

==== Church plaza ====
The church plaza, locally called Muraya, is mainly used for large church activities. It is believed to be a former burial ground and site of an early Hispanic burial site. Archaeological excavations undertaken by the University of San Carlos revealed several burial sites, antique jars and dishes, a necklace and a gold earring. The gold earring, the first archaeological find of its kind in a Philippine burial site, is probably worn by a person of high status and may have indicated "wealth, influence or great power".

==== Blockhouse ====
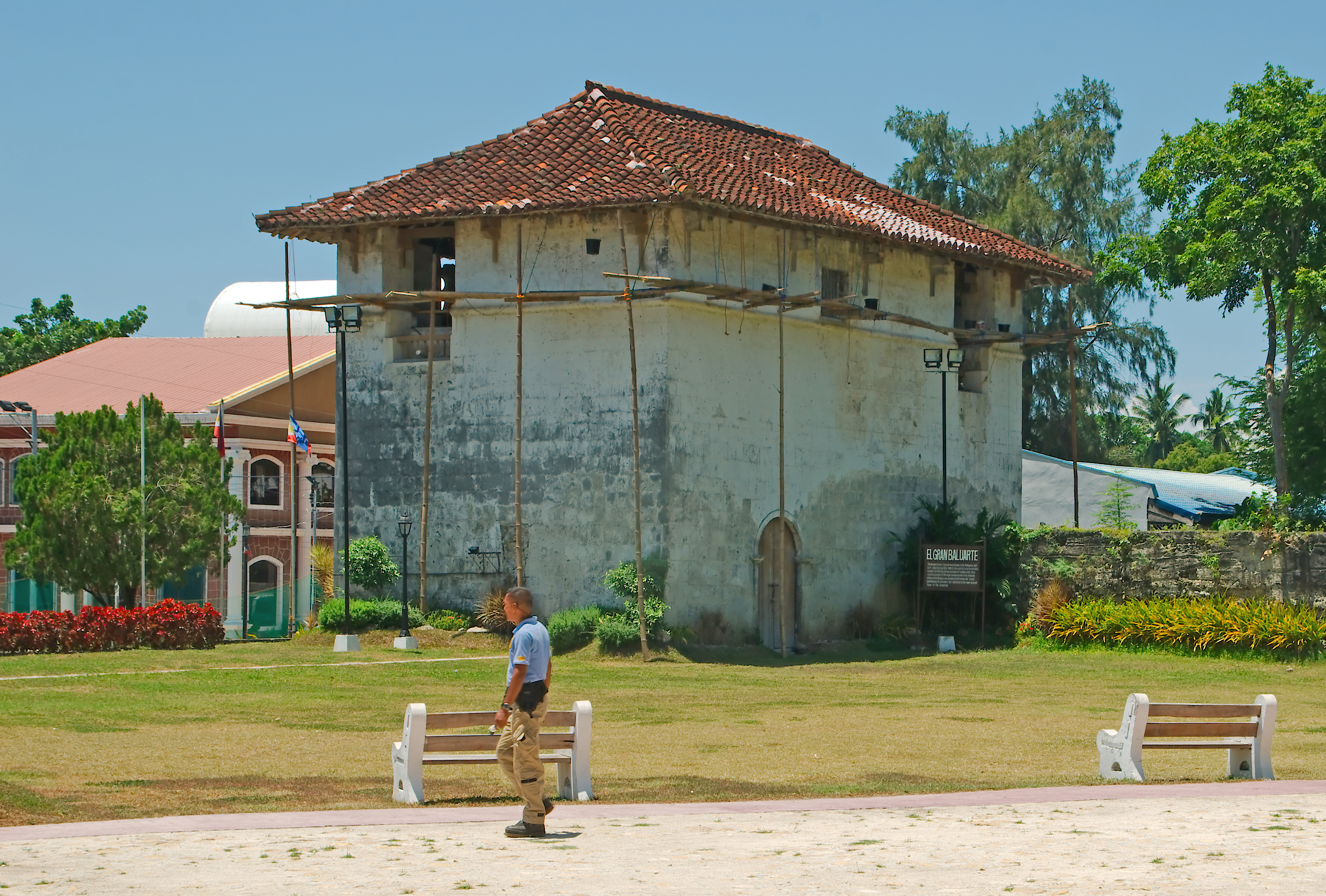
The blockhouse

Also called the fortress or Dakong Balay (Big House), the quadrangular blockhouse was first built by Father Julian Bermejo when he came to Boljoon in 1808. The 120-by-80-metre (390 ft × 260 ft) blockhouse served as an artillery store and as the main fortress in the church complex. It is a two-story structure with a tile-covered parapet, built of coral stone with a tiled roof. Today it serves as a bell tower.

==== Cemetery ====
The first burials in Boljoon's cemetery probably occurred in the 1760s. It was closed when a public cemetery was opened. Its gates might have been built in the 1700s, or in 1783 when the present church was constructed. Consisting of coral stones, the cemetery has a symmetrical stone arch gateway with a three-layer pediment, finials on both sides of the two-lower layers and a stone relief of a human skeleton on top. The walls are also adorned with a relief of a human skull and bones.

==== Ilihan Watchtower ruins ====
A former square watchtower made out of coral stone stands on the Bohol coast. It is said to have been constructed by Father Bermejo as part of the church's massive fortification efforts.

== The statue of Patrocinio de María ==
The devotion to Patrocinio de Maria Santísima began in 1599, when the Augustinians established a chapel in Nabulho, that would later be known as Boljoon, dedicated to the Patronage of Mary, Most Holy. The image of the Blessed Virgin Mary was brought to the town by Fray Bartolomé de García from Spain. For their part, the people learned the associated prayers and devotions. The chapel was elevated to the status of parish on October 31, 1690, by Father Francisco de Zamora, Provincial of the Augustinians, as a result of the growing Christian population. The decision was implemented upon the appointment of Father Nicolás de la Cuadra as its first parish priest on April 5, 1692. The image of Nuestra Señora del Patrocinio de Boljoon is a de tallado image of the Madonna and Child, with a wooden body and a beautifully carved heads and hands. The image is often dressed in white and blue vestments, and a gold veil.

The image was given an episcopal coronation on November 14, 2020, and in 2022, the image was granted a pontifical decree of Canonical coronation. The Canonical coronation rites took place on April 23, 2022, in line with concluding ceremonies celebrating 500 Years of Christianity in the Philippines.
