= Tumauini Church =

Roman Catholic church in Isabela, Philippines

- Saint Matthias Parish Church
- Iglesia Parroquial de San Matías (Spanish)
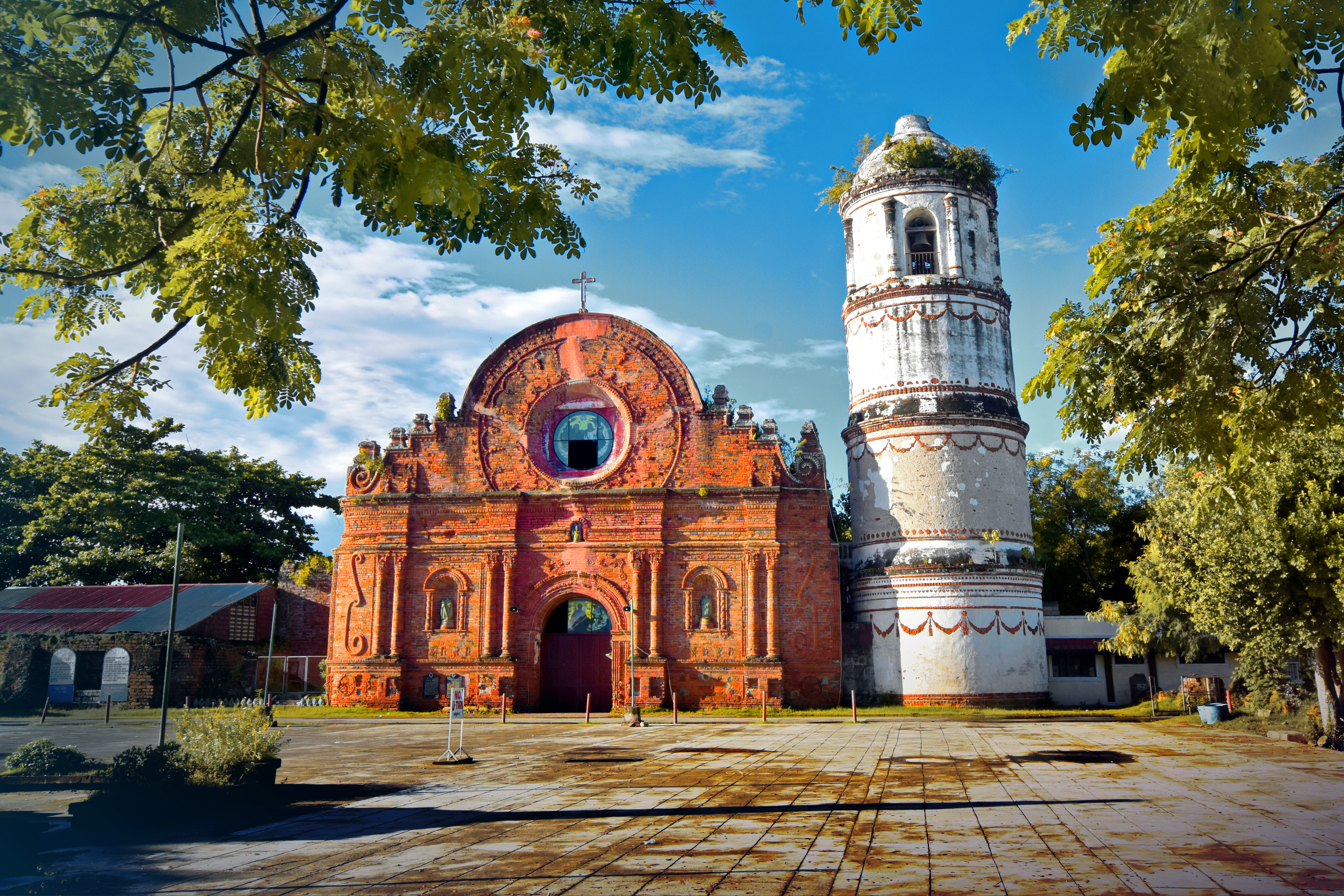
- Church façade and bell tower in 2017

- Location in Luzon Location in the Philippines
- 17°16′31″N 121°48′26″E
- Location: Tumauini, Isabela
- Country: Philippines
- Denomination: Roman Catholic

History
- Status: Parish church
- Founded: 1707
- Founder(s): Francisco Nuñez, O.P
- Dedication: Saint Matthias

Architecture
- Functional status: Active
- Heritage designation: National Cultural Treasure
- Architect: Fr. Domingo Forto
- Architectural type: Church building
- Style: Baroque
- Groundbreaking: 1783
- Completed: 1805

Administration
- Province: Isabela
- Archdiocese: Tuguegarao
- Diocese: Ilagan

Clergy
- Archbishop: Most Rev. Sergio L. Utleg, D.D
- Bishop: Most Rev. David William V. Antonio, D.D.
- Priest(s): Very Rev. Gregorio Marvic C. Uanan, JCD, JV

Saint Matthias Parish Church, commonly known as Tumauini Church, is a Roman Catholic church in the municipality of Tumauini, Isabela, Philippines, within the jurisdiction of the Diocese of Ilagan. It became a separate parish independent from Cabagan under the advocacy of Saint Matthias in 1751.

The church, known for its brick, Baroque-style architecture, was declared a National Cultural Treasure by the National Museum of the Philippines. Together with the churches of Boljoon, Guiuan, Loboc and Lazi, the Tumauini Church has been considered for the UNESCO World Heritage Tentative List since 2006 under the collective group of Baroque Churches of the Philippines (Extension).

== History ==
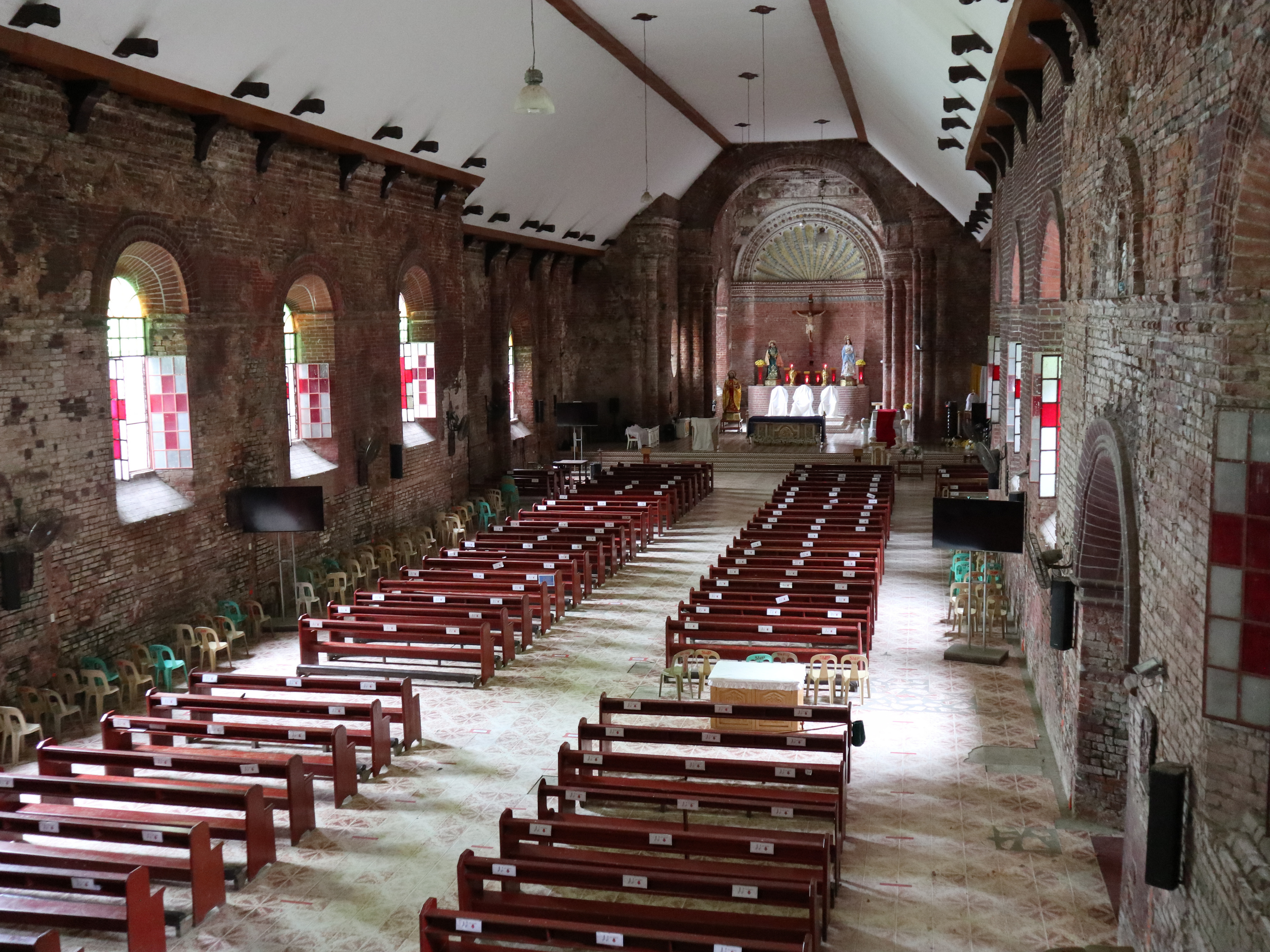
Church interior in 2022

The first church made of nipa and other light materials was built by the Dominican priest Francisco Nuñez in 1707, and dedicated to Saint Matthias. Tumauini became an independent parish from Cabagan in 1751. The current church was built under the auspices of another Dominican, Domingo Forto, in 1783 and later continued by the priest Antonio Herrera in 1788. In constructing the church, Forto hired artisans from as far south as Pampanga. It was completed in 1805.

The church was damaged during the Second World War; a faithful reconstruction program followed, with undamaged parts of the church building retained.

== Features ==
Tumauini is an ultra-baroque church known for its extensive use of red bricks on its exterior and interior ornamentations. Brick was used due to lack of good quality stones in the area.

=== Façade ===
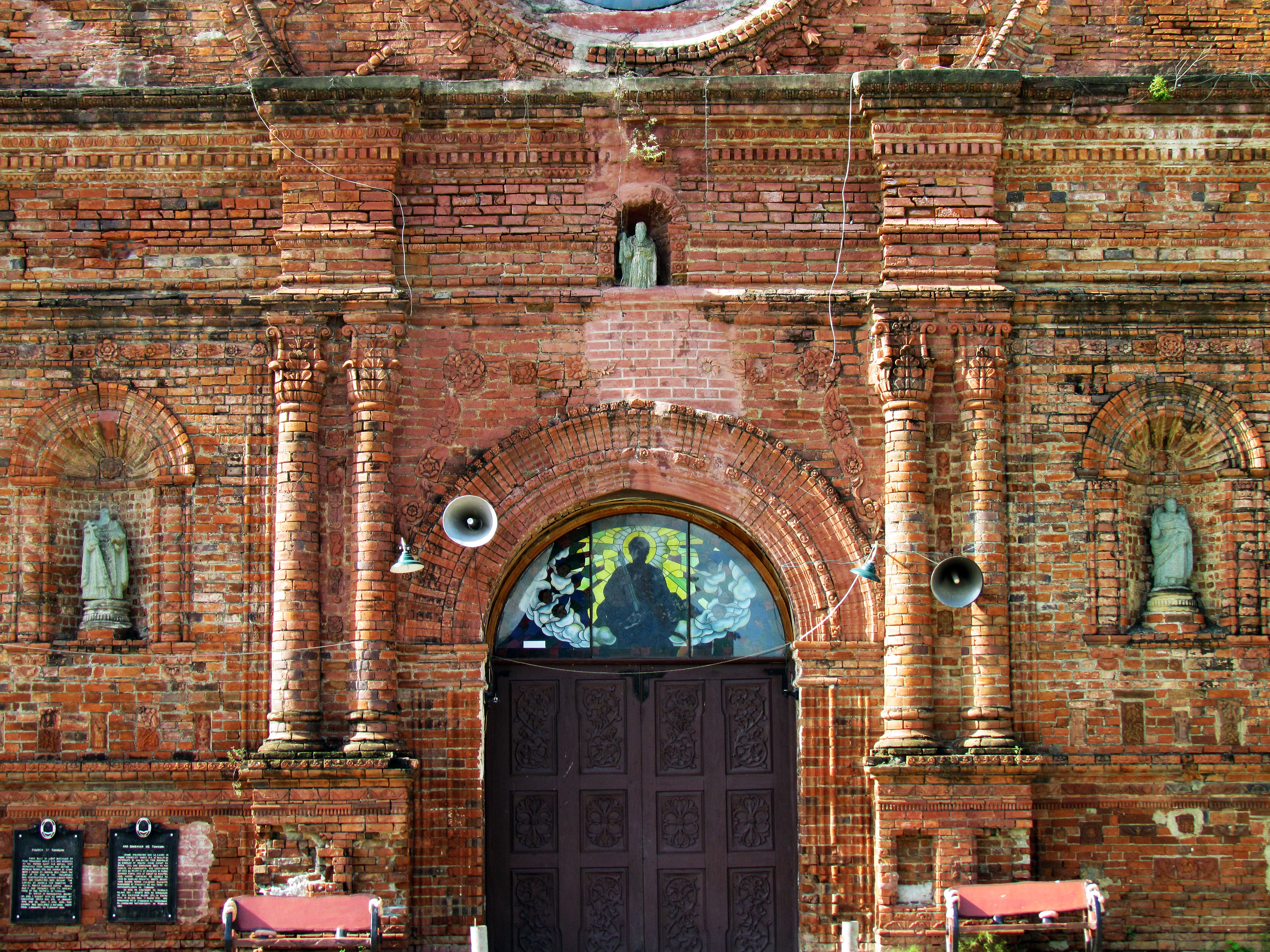
The church's main portal

The church building is made entirely of ornately designed red bricks in its façade and its interior walls. A closer look at the brick façade shows numbers and dates for the correct sequence of the bricks in Forto's design. The façade is flanked by two pseudo-Corinthian columns and niches, one located above the entrance and the two remaining larger niches on each side of the columns. The church's circular pediment is unique relative to all other churches built during the Spanish Era.

=== Belfry ===
Attached to the church's façade is a unique cylindrical belfry built in 1805. It is the only known Spanish colonial era cylindrical tower in the country. The tiered belfry notably resembles a wedding cake.

The bell housed within has bullet holes but was never recast.

=== Convento ===
The ruins of the church's convento (clergy house) are located on the gospel side of the church.

== Historical and cultural declarations ==
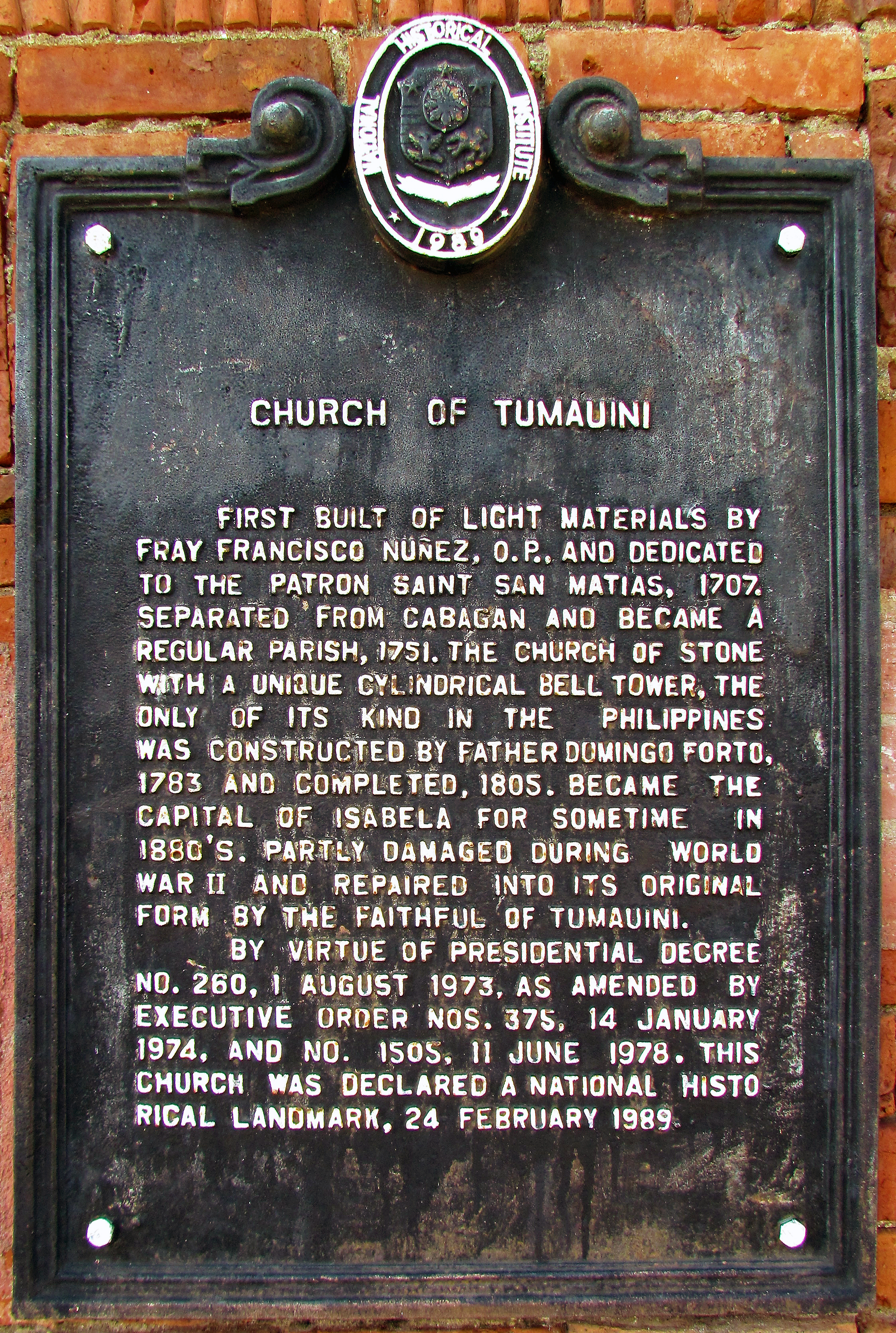
Church NHI historical marker installed in 1989

Tumauini Church was declared a National Cultural Treasure by the National Museum of the Philippines. The National Historical Commission of the Philippines declared Tumauini Church a National Historic Landmark on February 24, 1989.

It is also being considered for addition to the UNESCO World Heritage Sites of the Philippines under the Baroque Churches of the Philippines (Extension) with the churches of Patrocinio de María in Boljoon, Cebu; La Inmaculada Concepción in Guiuan, Samar; San Pedro Ápostol in Loboc, Bohol; and San Isidro Labrador in Lazi, Siquijor.

== Bibliography ==
- Lim-Castillo, Pia (2007). "Eggs in Philippine Church Architecture and its Cuisine". In Hosking, Richard (ed.). Eggs in Cookery: Proceedings of the Oxford Symposium of Food and Cookery 2006. Oxford Symposium. p. 117. ISBN 9781903018545.
- Historical Markers: Regions I–IV and CAR. Manila: National Historical Institute (Philippines). 1993. p. 176. ISBN 9715380611.
