= Lazi Church =

Roman Catholic church in Siquijor, Philippines

- San Isidro Labrador Parish Church
- Parokya ni San Isidro Labrador (Filipino); Iglesia Parroquial de San Isidro Labrador (Spanish)
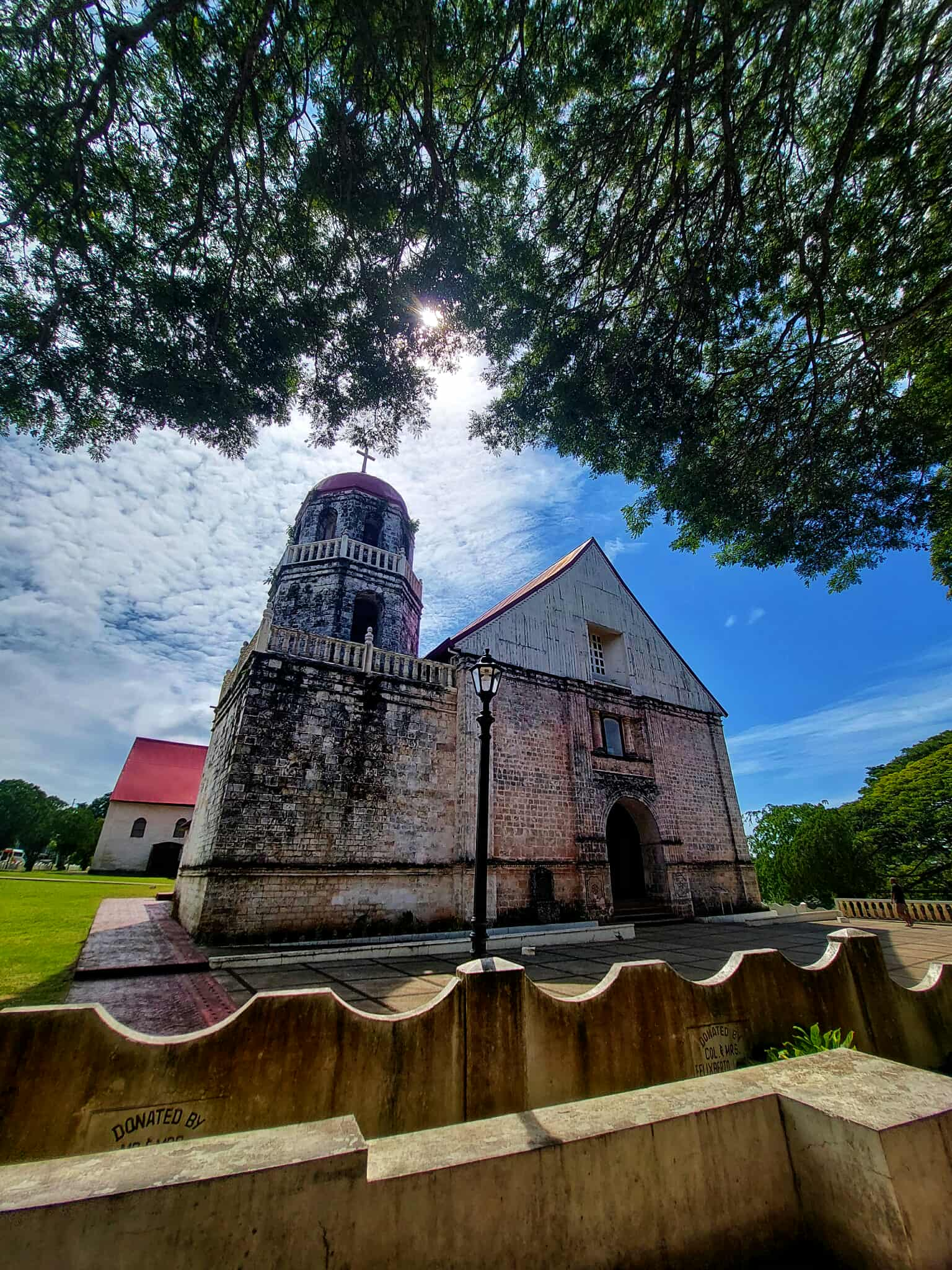
- Lazi Church in August 2025

- Location in the Visayas Location in the Philippines
- 9°07′40″N 123°38′02″E
- Location: Lazi, Siquijor
- Country: Philippines
- Denomination: Roman Catholic

History
- Status: Parish church
- Founded: August 8, 1857; 169 years ago
- Dedication: Isidore the Laborer

Architecture
- Functional status: Active
- Heritage designation: National Cultural Treasure
- Architectural type: Church building
- Style: Neoclassical
- Completed: 1884; 142 years ago

Specifications
- Materials: Stone, coral

Administration
- Metropolis: Cebu
- Diocese: Dumaguete
- Deanery: Vicariate of St. Paul

San Isidro Labrador Parish Church, commonly known as Lazi Church, is a Roman Catholic church in the municipality of Lazi, Siquijor, Philippines within the jurisdiction of the Diocese of Dumaguete. It became an independent parish in 1857 under the advocacy of Saint Isidore the Laborer.

The church, also known for its huge convent, was declared a National Cultural Treasure by the National Museum of the Philippines. It is also nominated for the UNESCO World Heritage Tentative List since 2006 under the collective group of Baroque Churches of the Philippines (Extension) together with the churches of Boljoon, Guiuan, Loboc and Tumauini. In 2014, the government announced its plan to nominate Lazi Church in the World Heritage List. It conducted a dossier training for Lazi representatives; once the dossiers are completed, the long process of nomination will commence in Paris.

== History ==
Lazi (formerly Tigbawan) became an independent parish from Siquijor on August 8, 1857. The present stone church was built in 1884 by Filipino artisans followed by the bell tower in the following year. The construction of the convent was made with coral stones and hardwood, commenced in 1887 and completed in 1891. Both the church and the convent were done under the direction of Recollect priest Father Toribio Sánchez.

== Architecture ==
The church is built of sea stones and wood. It belongs to the neoclassical style. It has two pulpits and has retained its original retablo and wood floorings.

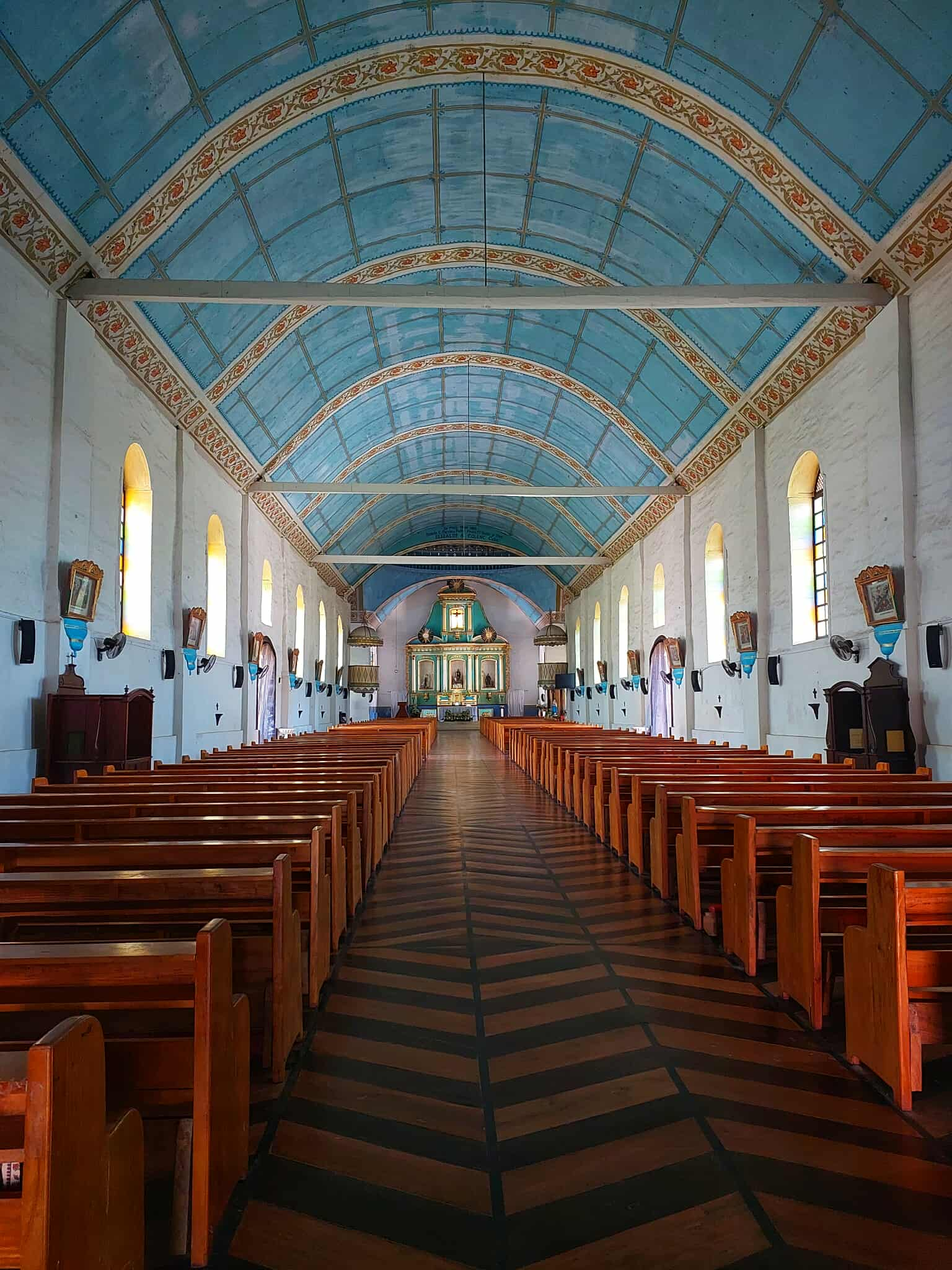
Church nave in 2025

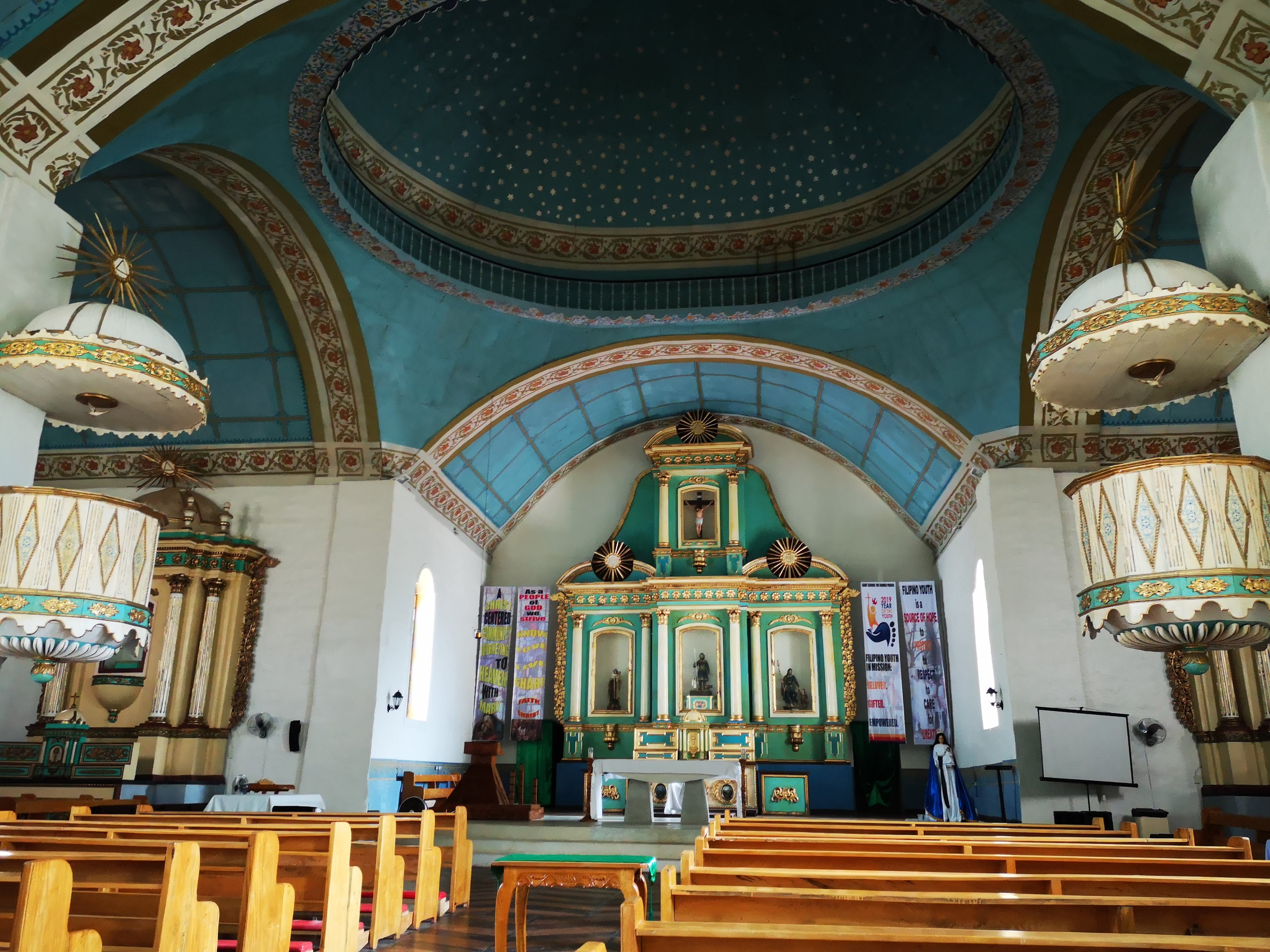
Star dome and reredos

Baptistery

=== Convent ===
The U-shaped Bahay na bato convent is one of the largest convents built during the Spanish colonial era. On its first floor are stonewalls while wood panels can be found on the second floor. Its dimension is 42 metres (138 ft) by 38 metres (125 ft). It is funded by donations from parishes and missions of the Recollects. Partitions of the convent were removed but the original structure was maintained. It now houses the Siquijor Heritage Museum which has collections of important church relics and paraphernalia.

Lazi Convent

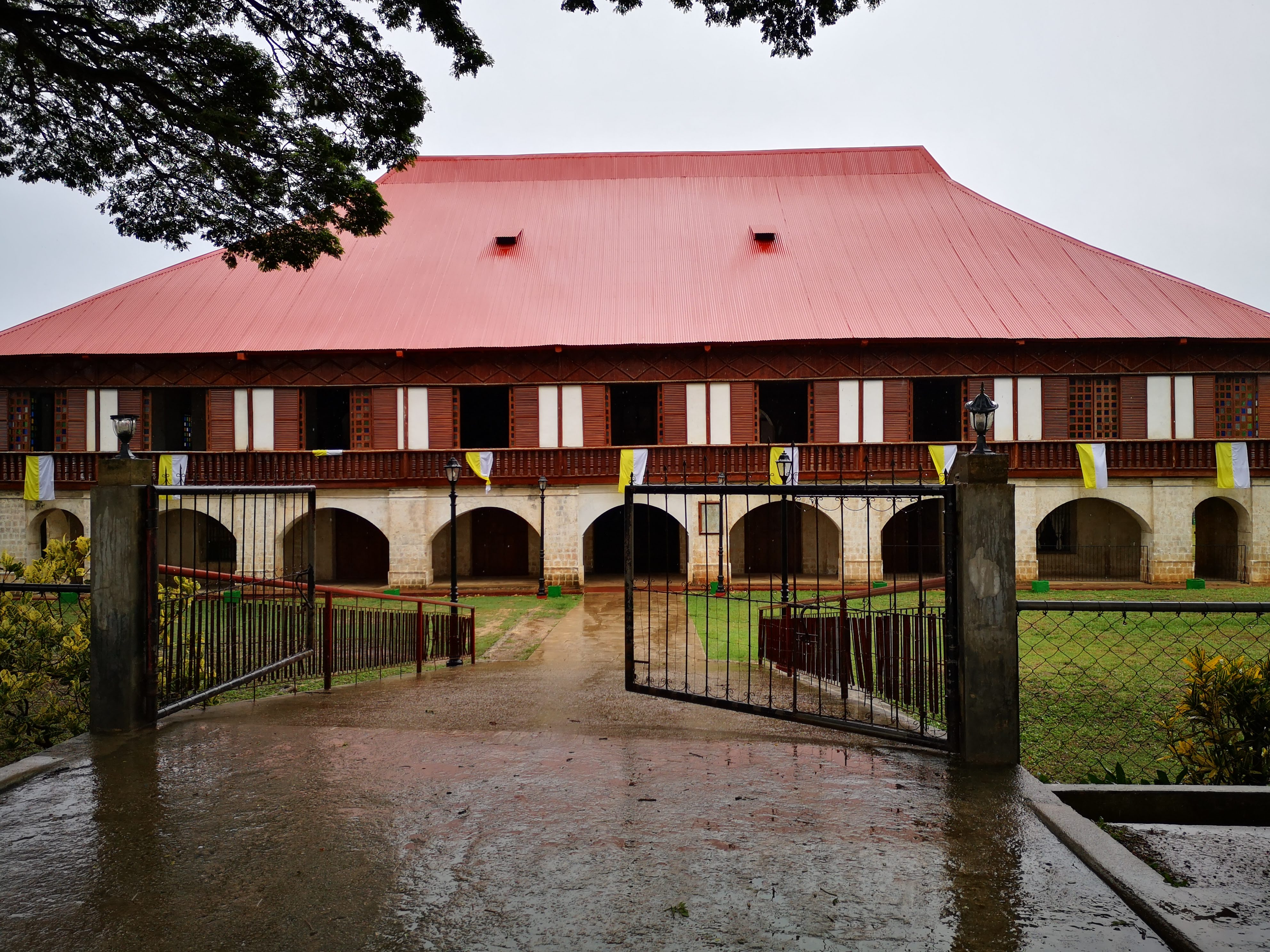
Convent exterior, after repair September 2019

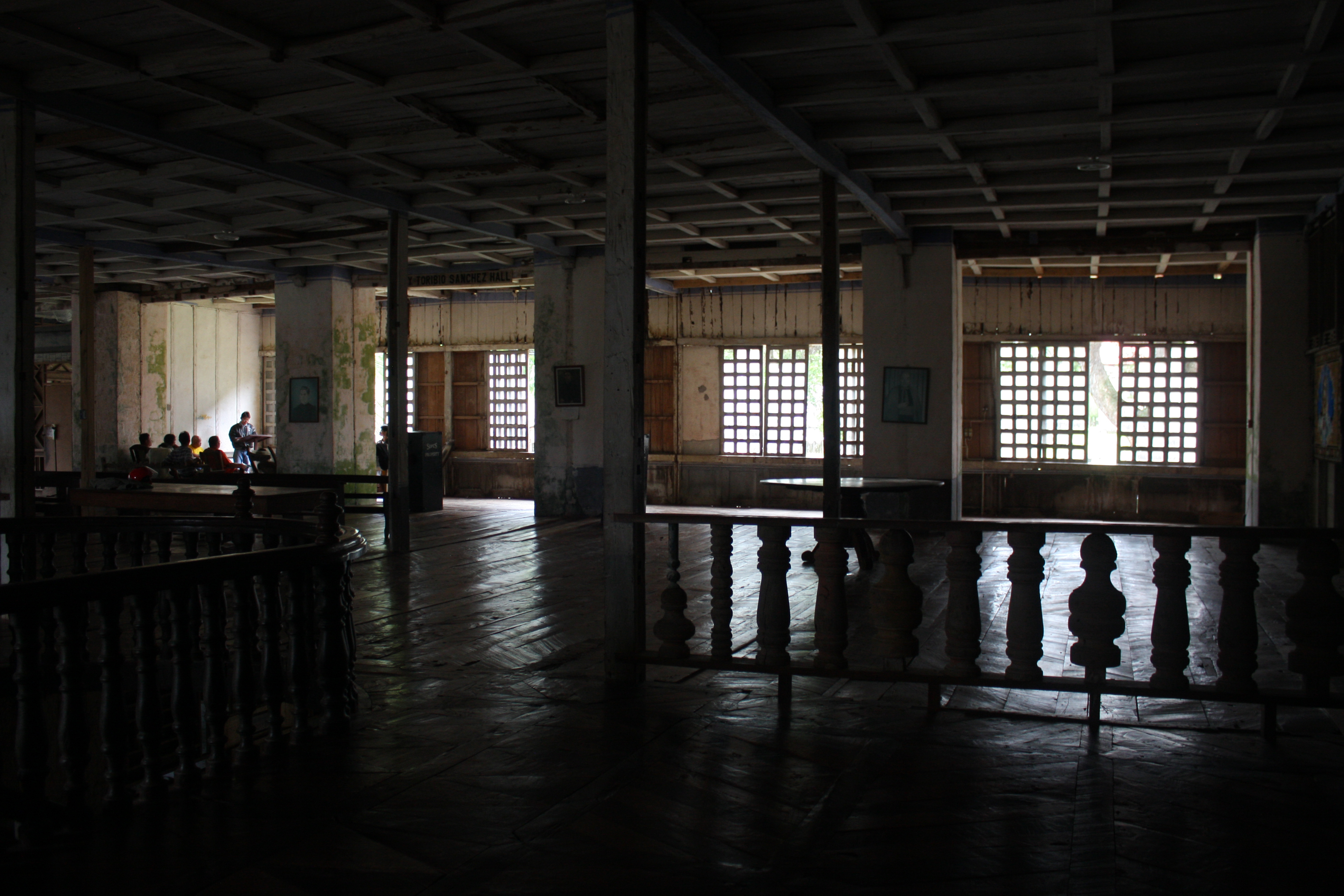
Convent interior

== Historical and cultural declarations ==
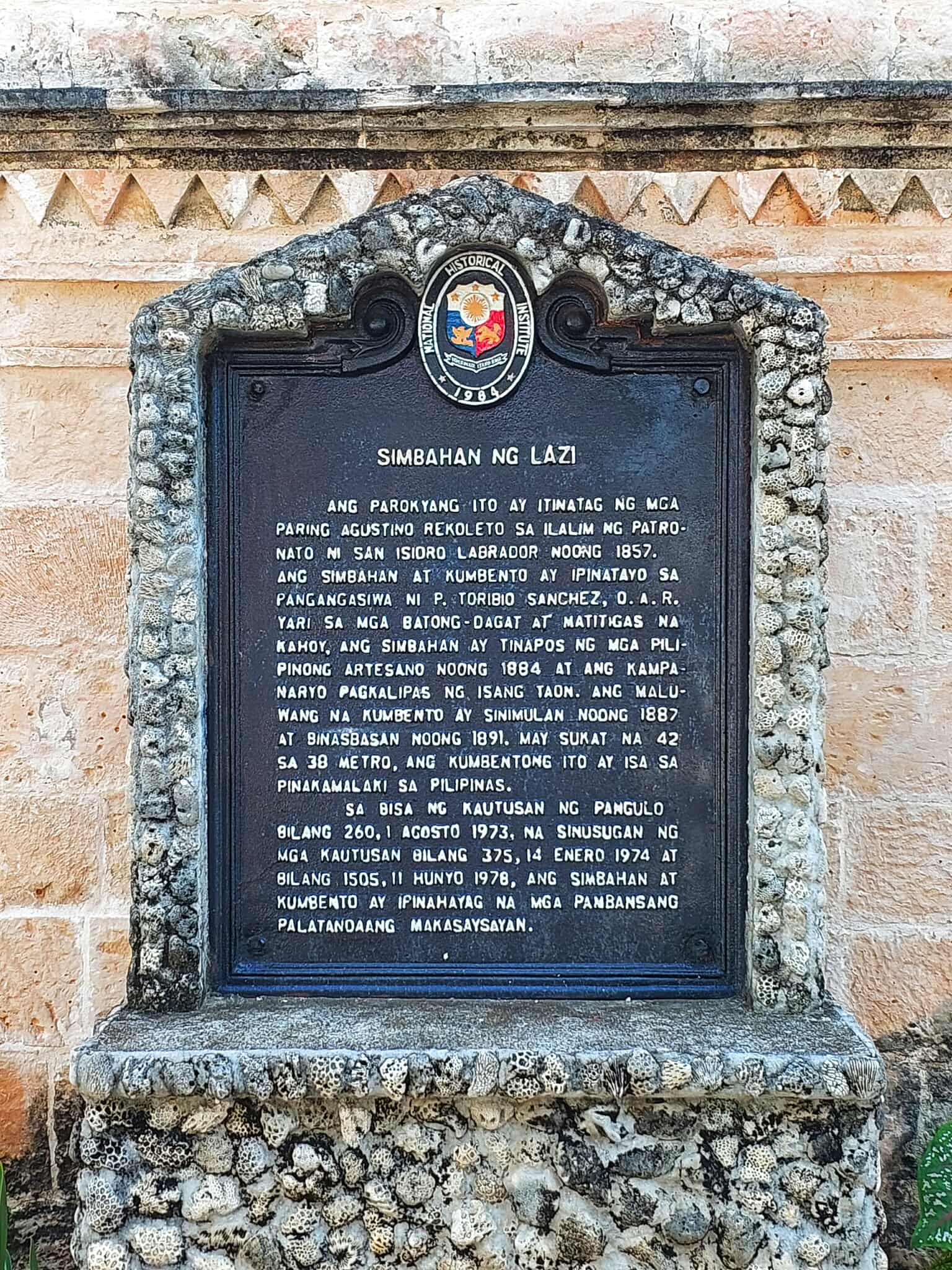
Church NHI historical marker installed in 1984

Lazi Church was declared a National Cultural Treasure by the National Museum of the Philippines in 2001. It was also declared a National Historical Landmark by the National Historical Commission of the Philippines in 1984. It is also nominated to be part of the UNESCO World Heritage Sites of the Philippines under the Baroque Churches of the Philippines (Extension) with the churches of Patrocinio de María in Boljoon, Cebu; La Inmaculada Concepción in Guiuan, Eastern Samar; San Pedro Ápostol in Loboc, Bohol and San Mattias in Tumauini, Isabela.

== Bibliography ==
- Historical Markers: Regions V-XII (in Filipino). Manila: National Historical Institute (Philippines). 1993. p. 88. ISBN 9715380697.
