= Lazi, Siquijor =

Municipality in Siquijor, Philippines

Lazi
- Municipality
- Municipality of Lazi
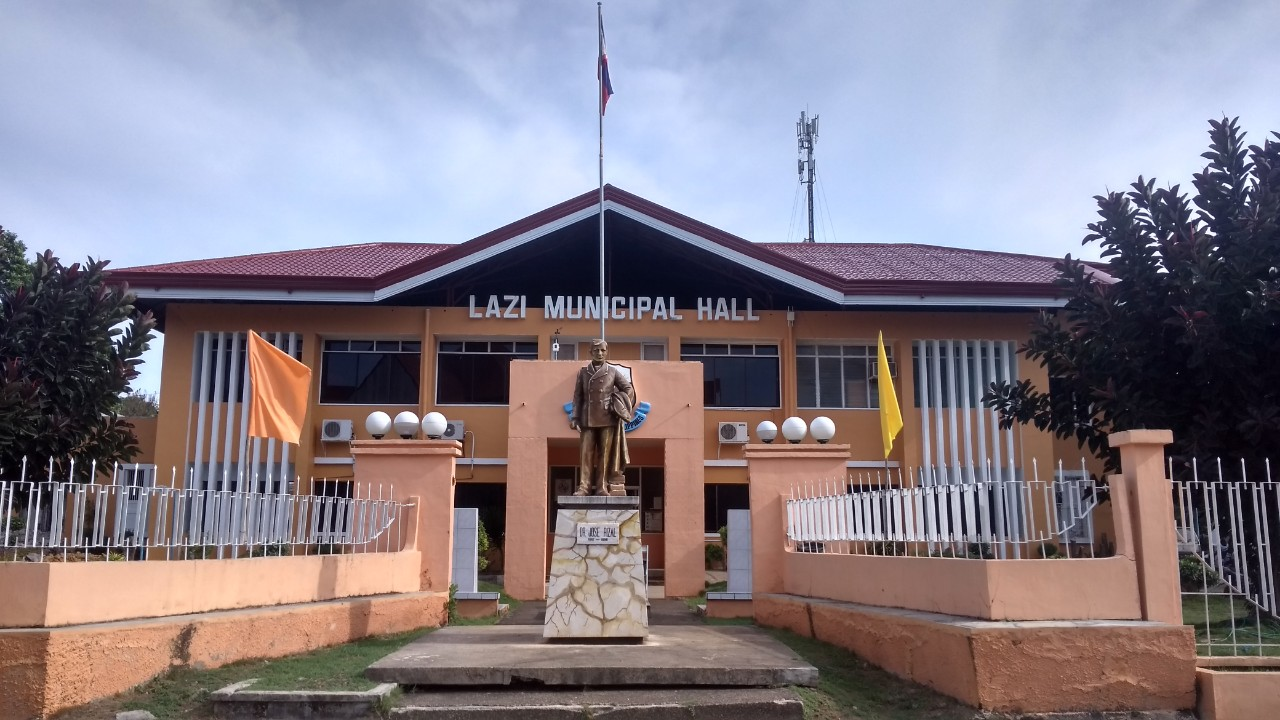
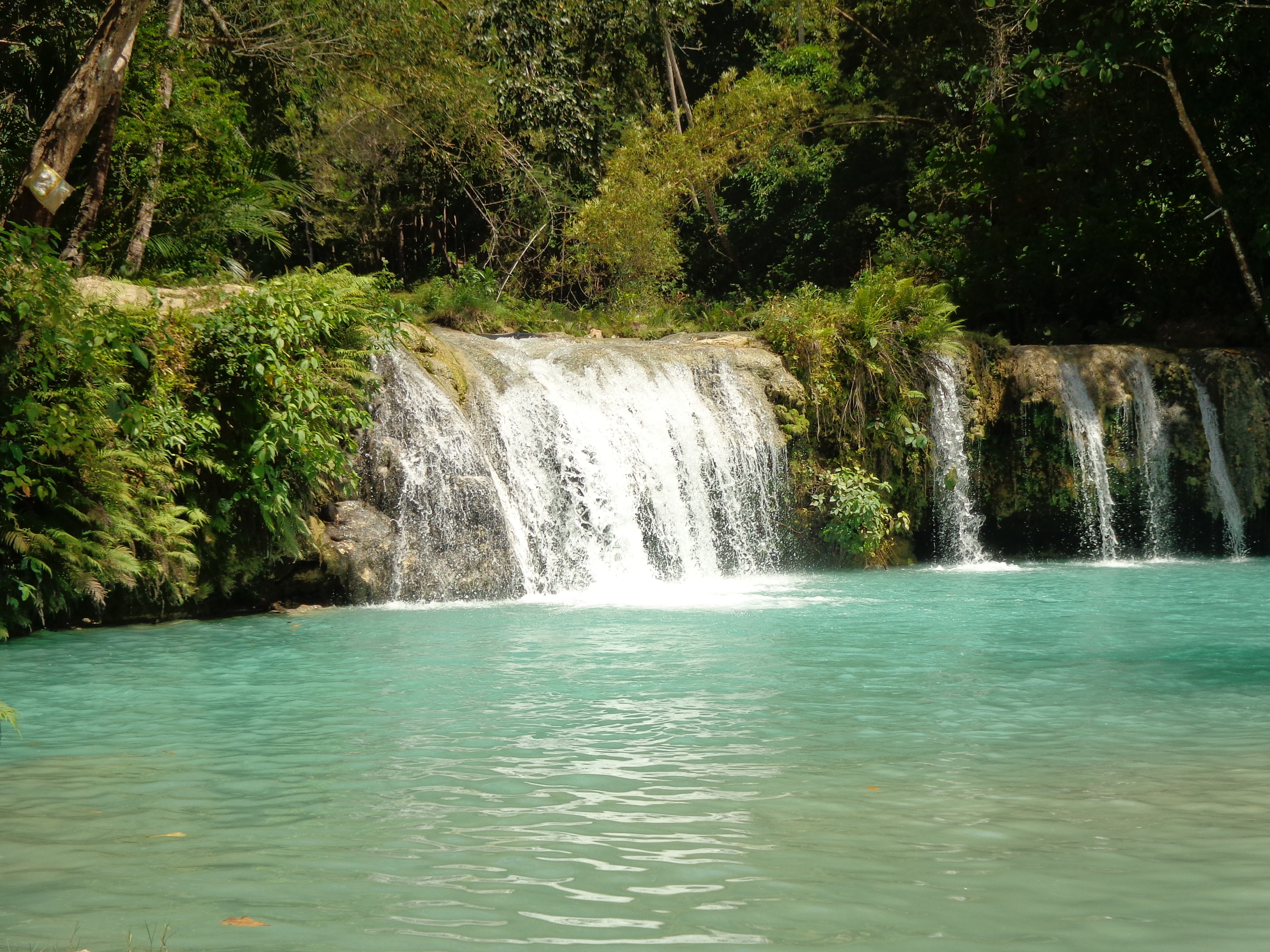
- Lazi Church New Lazi Municipal Hall Cambugahay Falls

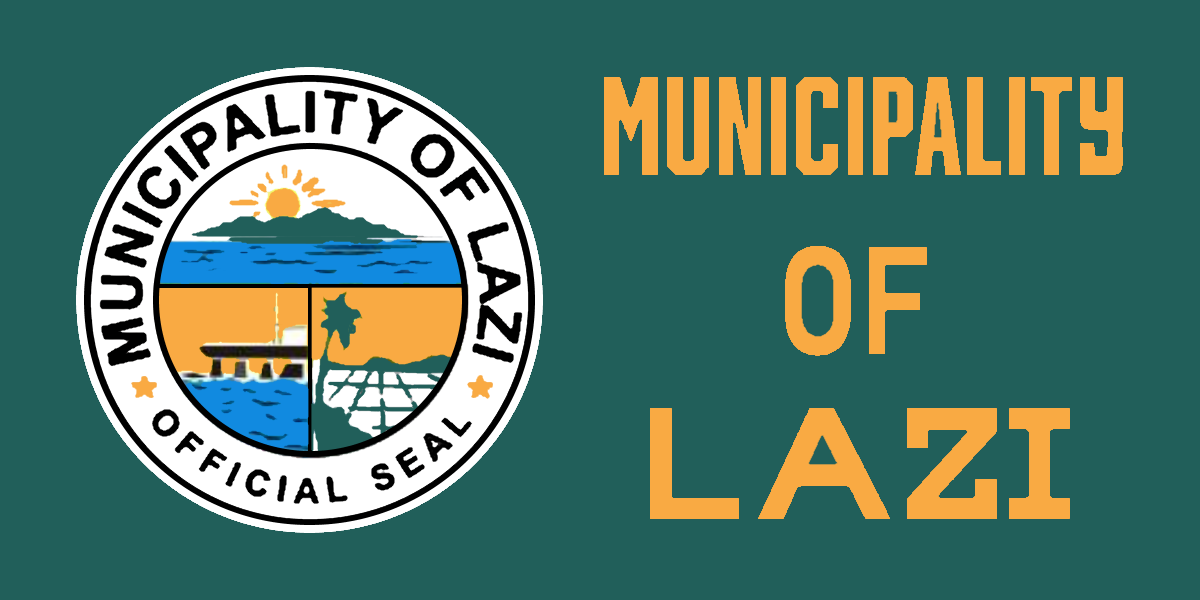
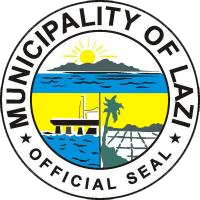
- Flag Seal

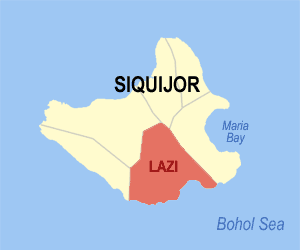
- Map of Siquijor with Lazi highlighted
- Interactive map of Lazi
- Location within the Philippines
- Coordinates: 9°07′41″N 123°38′02″E
- Country: Philippines
- Region: Negros Island Region
- Province: Siquijor
- District: Lone district
- Founded: 1857
- Named for: Manuel Pavia y Lacy
- Barangays: 18 (see Barangays)

Government
  - Type: Sangguniang Bayan
  - Mayor: Phil Moore D. Largo (PFP)
  - Vice Mayor: Michael O. Omictin (PFP)
  - Representative: Zaldy Villa (Lakas)
  - Municipal Council: Members: Juvy T. Balacy; Remefrancis L. Sierras; Jerry D. Tumapon; Myrna B. Ondo; Primo B. Sumalpong, Jr.; Prisco C. Tan Pastor; Irene J. Tuastomban; Dale L. Dimagnaong
  - Electorate: 16,597 voters (2025)

Area
  - Total: 70.64 km^{2} (27.27 sq mi)
- Elevation: 28 m (92 ft)
- Highest elevation: 599 m (1,965 ft)
- Lowest elevation: 0 m (0 ft)

Population (2024 census)
  - Total: 23,092
  - Density: 326.9/km^{2} (846.7/sq mi)
  - Households: 5,654

Economy
  - Income class: 4th municipal income class
  - Poverty incidence: 6.89% (2023)
  - Revenue: ₱ 133.5 million (2024)
  - Assets: ₱ 418.8 million (2024)
  - Expenditure: ₱ 66.35 million (2024)
  - Liabilities: ₱ 82.37 million (2024)

Service provider
  - Electricity: Province of Siquijor Electric Cooperative (PROSIELCO)
- Time zone: UTC+8 (PST)
- ZIP code: 6228
- PSGC: 076103000
- IDD : area code: +63 (0)35
- Native languages: Cebuano; Tagalog
- Patron saint: Saint Isidore the Farmer
- Website: lazi-siquijor.gov.ph

Lazi, officially the Municipality of Lazi (Cebuano: Lungsod sa Lazi; Tagalog: Bayan ng Lazi), is a municipality in the province of Siquijor, Philippines. According to the 2024 census, it has a population of 23,092 people.

Lazi Church is currently included in the tentative list for UNESCO World Heritage Sites as part of the Baroque Churches of the Philippines (Extension). Scholars have proposed a separate UNESCO nomination for "Old Centre of Lazi, which includes the Lazi Church".

Lazi is 32 kilometres (20 mi) from the provincial capital Siquijor.

== Geography ==
=== Barangays ===
Lazi is politically subdivided into 18 barangays. Each barangay consists of puroks and some have sitios.

PSGC	Barangay	Population			±% p.a.	
		2024		2010		
076103001	Campalanas	9.6%	2,215	1,873	▴	1.16%
076103002	Cangclaran	2.6%	598	533	▴	0.80%
076103003	Cangomantong	4.9%	1,130	924	▴	1.40%
076103004	Capalasanan	5.6%	1,286	1,214	▴	0.40%
076103005	Catamboan (Pob.)	7.8%	1,809	1,617	▴	0.78%
076103006	Gabayan	9.1%	2,097	1,934	▴	0.56%
076103007	Kimba	3.6%	828	657	▴	1.61%
076103008	Kinamandagan	4.5%	1,039	922	▴	0.83%
076103009	Lower Cabangcalan	4.6%	1,053	866	▴	1.36%
076103010	Nagerong	6.8%	1,562	1,313	▴	1.20%
076103011	Po‑o	3.2%	746	711	▴	0.33%
076103012	Simacolong	9.2%	2,120	1,801	▴	1.13%
076103013	Tagmanocan	4.0%	930	853	▴	0.60%
076103014	Talayong	2.9%	661	608	▴	0.58%
076103015	Tigbawan (Pob.)	7.1%	1,642	1,696	▾	−0.22%
076103016	Tignao	4.1%	957	887	▴	0.52%
076103017	Upper Cabangcalan	3.3%	770	658	▴	1.09%
076103018	Ytaya	4.5%	1,045	957	▴	0.61%
	Total		23,092	20,024	▴	0.99%

=== Climate ===
Climate data for Lazi, Siquijor
Month	Jan	Feb	Mar	Apr	May	Jun	Jul	Aug	Sep	Oct	Nov	Dec	Year
Mean daily maximum °C (°F)	29 (84)	30 (86)	31 (88)	32 (90)	31 (88)	30 (86)	30 (86)	30 (86)	30 (86)	29 (84)	29 (84)	29 (84)	30 (86)
Mean daily minimum °C (°F)	22 (72)	22 (72)	22 (72)	23 (73)	24 (75)	24 (75)	24 (75)	24 (75)	24 (75)	24 (75)	23 (73)	23 (73)	23 (74)
Average precipitation mm (inches)	26 (1.0)	22 (0.9)	28 (1.1)	41 (1.6)	95 (3.7)	136 (5.4)	147 (5.8)	126 (5.0)	132 (5.2)	150 (5.9)	98 (3.9)	46 (1.8)	1,047 (41.3)
Average rainy days	7.5	6.7	8.9	10.4	21.6	25.6	26.3	25.0	24.1	26.2	19.2	12.1	213.6
Source: Meteoblue

== Demographics ==
Population census of Lazi
Year	Pop.	±% p.a.
1903	9,658	—
1918	13,161	+2.08%
1939	15,157	+0.67%
1948	13,840	−1.00%
1960	13,288	−0.34%
1970	14,875	+1.13%
1975	16,049	+1.54%
1980	16,149	+0.12%
1990	16,672	+0.32%
1995	16,339	−0.38%
2000	18,314	+2.48%
2007	19,440	+0.83%
2010	20,024	+1.08%
2015	20,490	+0.44%
2020	22,488	+1.98%
2024	23,092	+0.64%
Source: Philippine Statistics Authority

== Economy ==
Poverty incidence of Lazi (%)

Source: Philippine Statistics Authority

== Education ==
The public schools in the town of Lazi are administered by two school districts under the Schools Division of Siquijor.

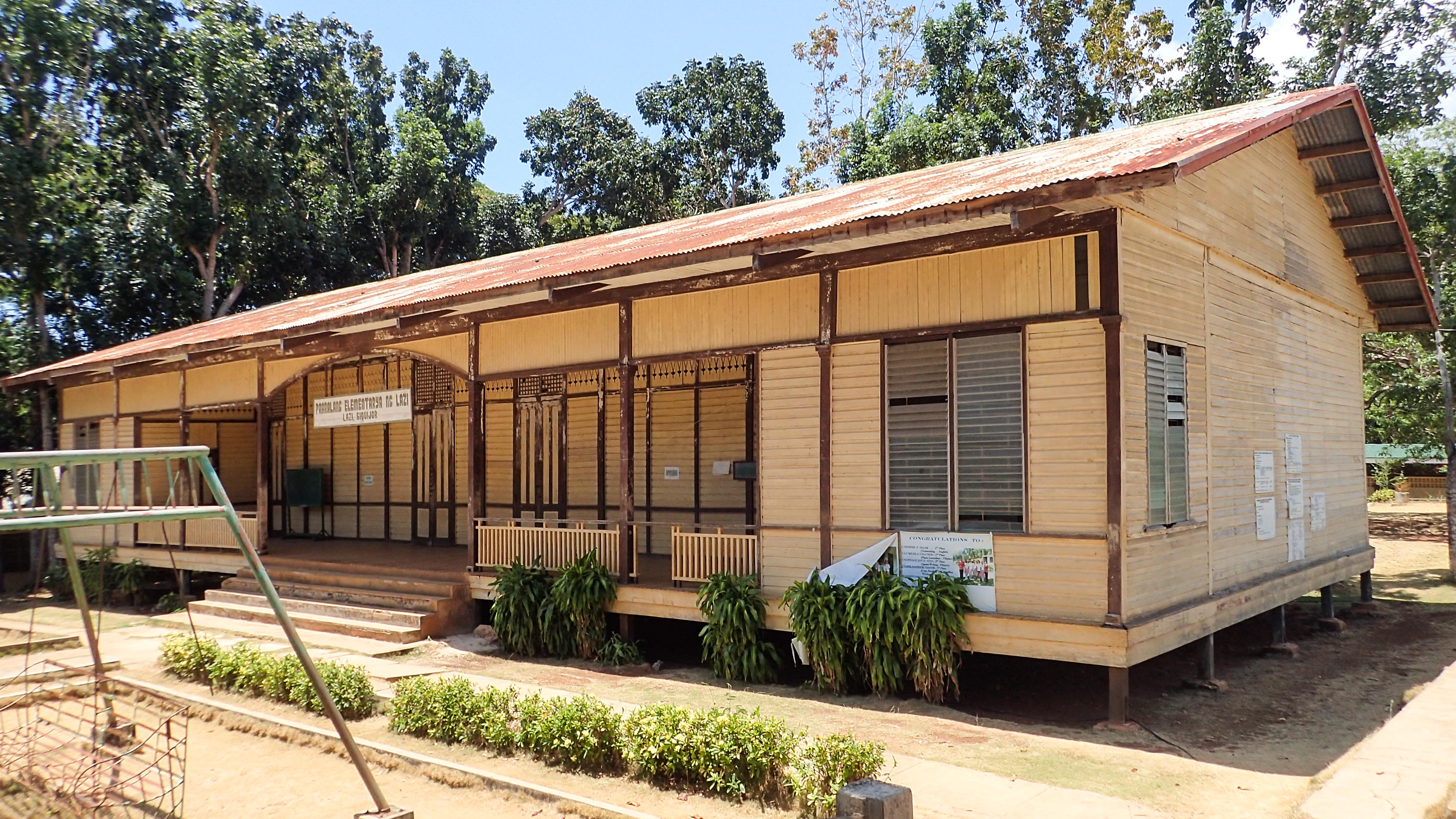
Lazi Elementary School Gabaldon building

Elementary schools:

- Cadoldolan Elementary School — Sitio Cadoldolan, Campalanas
- Campalanas Elementary School — Campalanas
- Cangclaran Elementary School — Cangclaran
- Cangomantong Elementary School — Cangomantong
- Capalasanan Elementary School — Capalasanan
- Dapdap Elementary School — Lower Cabangcalan
- Gabayan Elementary School — Gabayan
- Kimba Elementary School — Kimba
- Kinamandagan Elementary School — Kinamandagan
- Lazi Central Elementary School — Catamboan
- Po-o Elementary School — Po-o
- Simacolong Elementary School — Simacolong
- Tagmanocan Elementary School — Tagmanocan
- Tignao Elementary School — Tignao
- Ytaya Elementary School — Ytaya

High schools:

- Campalanas National High School — Campalanas
- Kinamandagan High School — Kinamandagan
- Lazi National Agricultural School — Tigbawan
- Leon Parami High School — Po-o

== Gallery ==
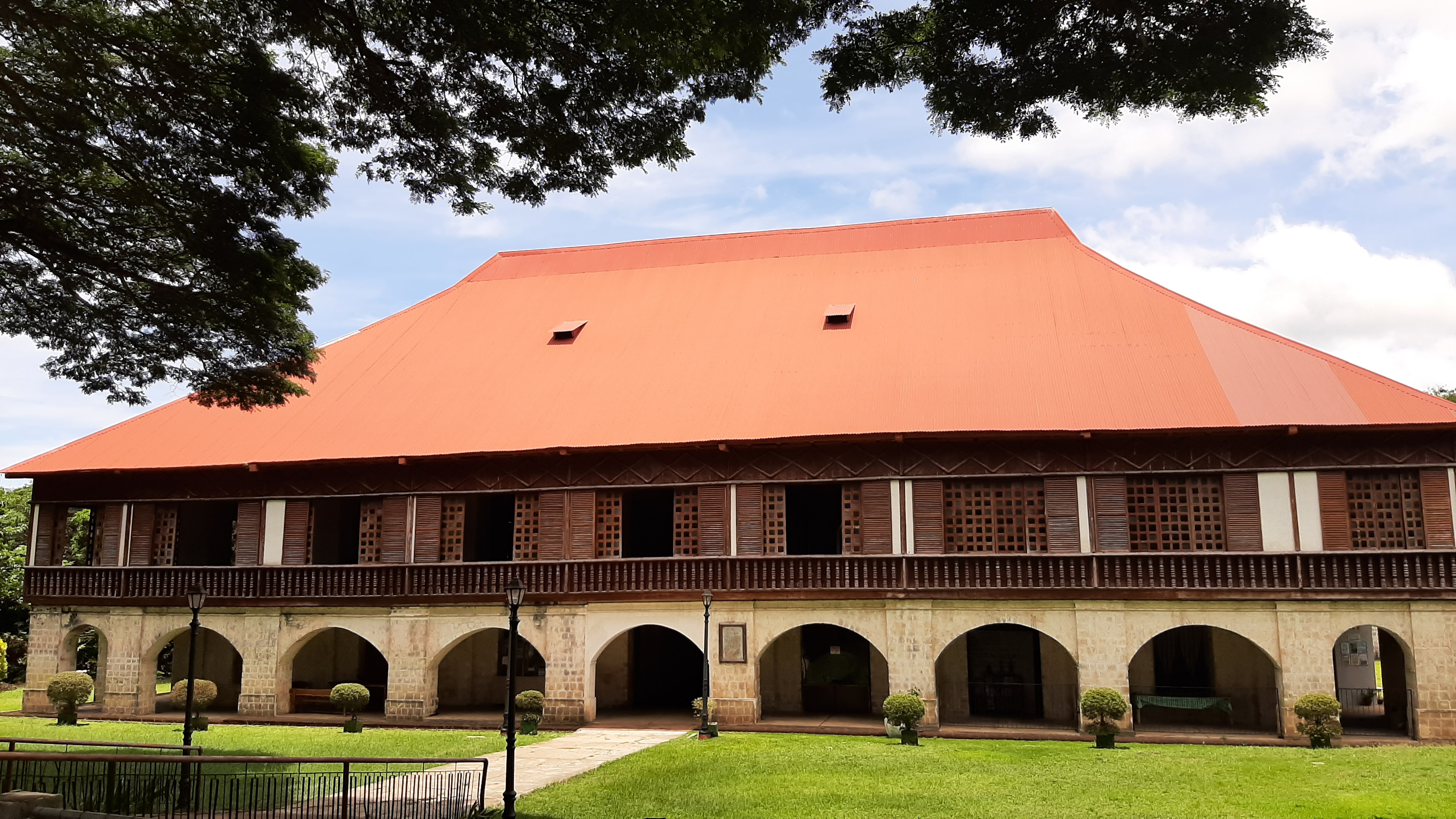
San Isidro Labrador Convent

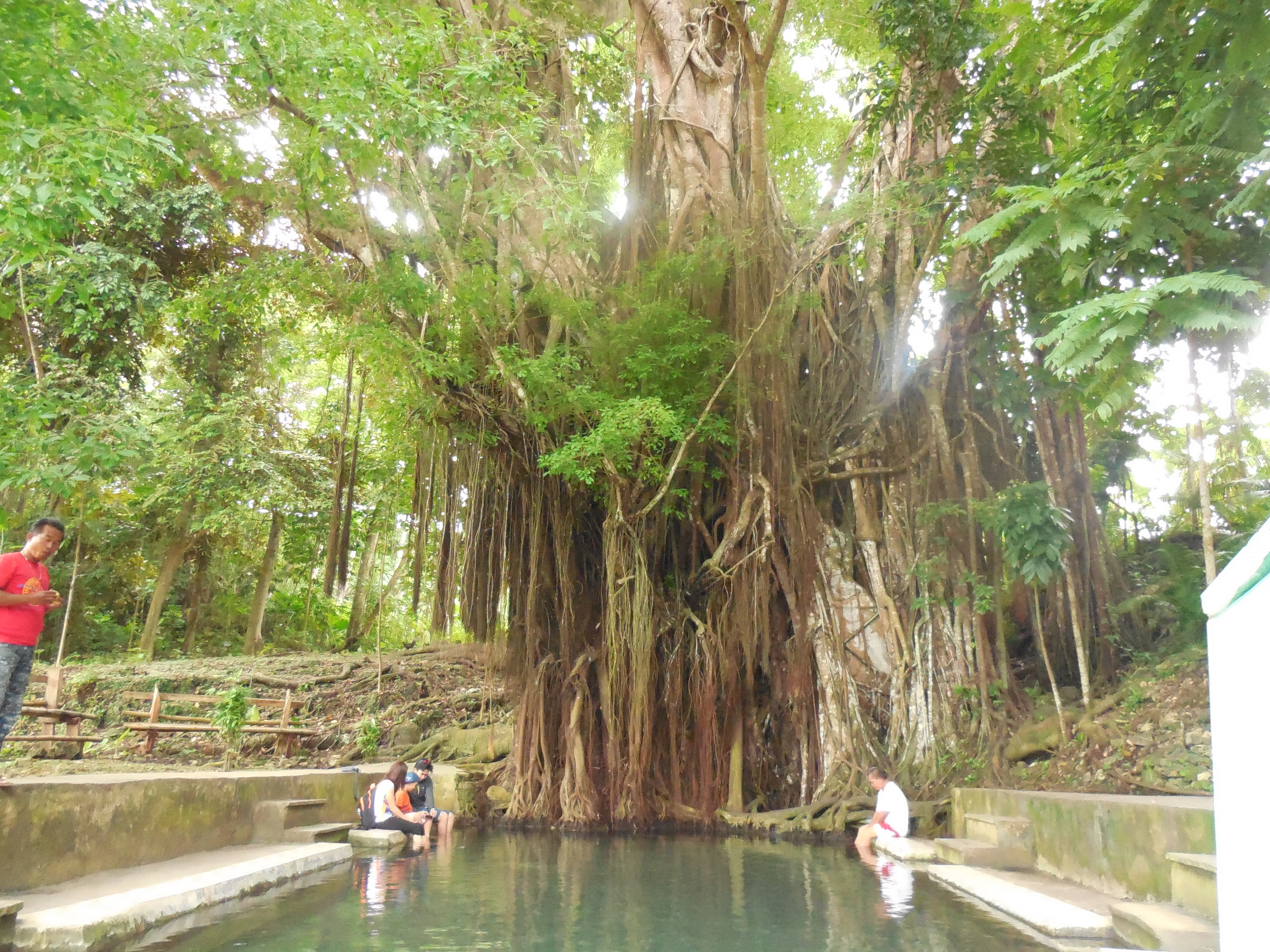
The century-old Enchanted Balete Tree

An ancestral house in Lazi

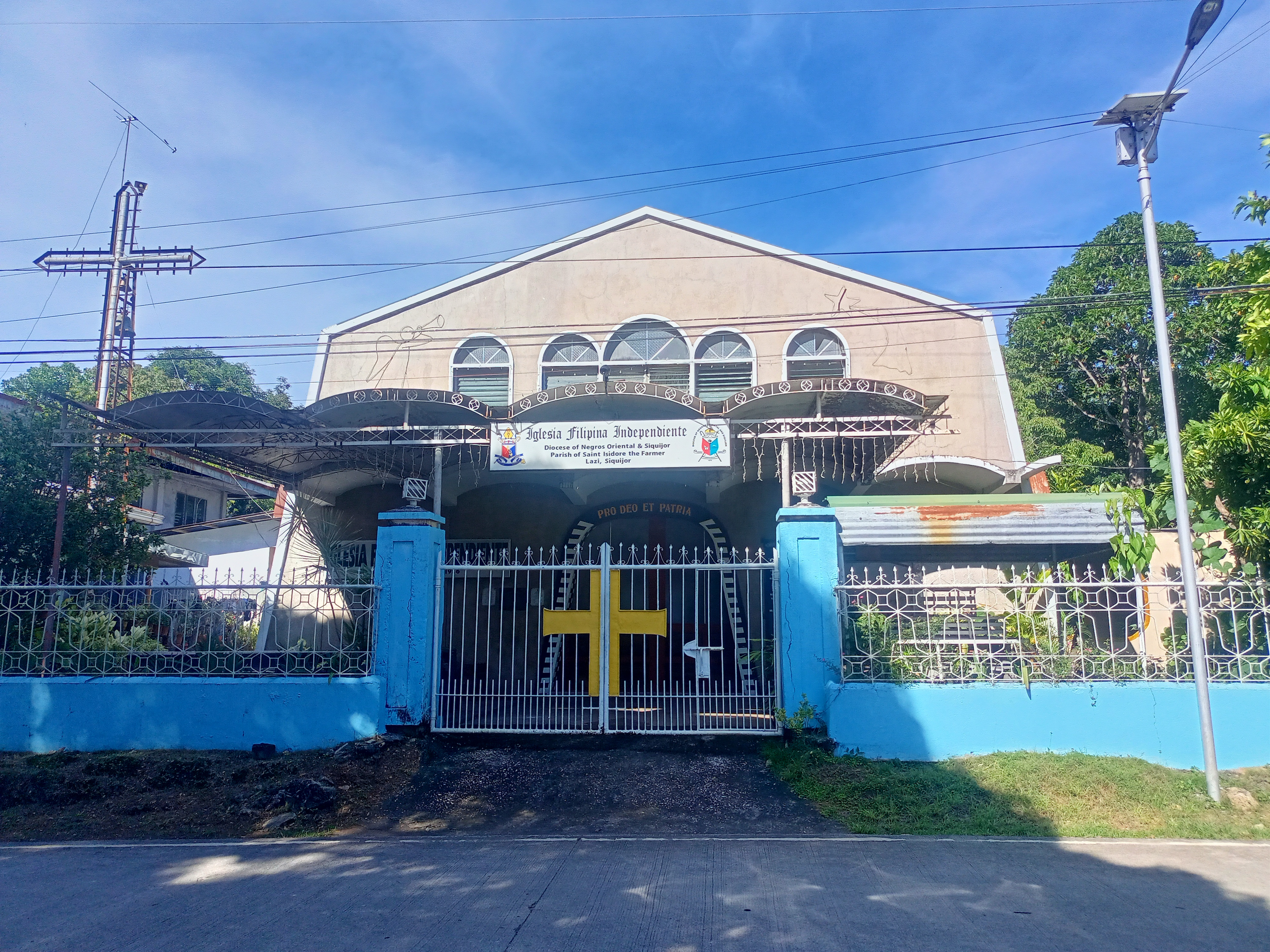
Church of the Iglesia Filipina Independiente Parish of Saint Isidore the Farmer
