= Diocese of Borongan =

Latin Catholic diocese in the Philippines

Coordinates: 11.6071°N 125.4327°E

Diocese of Borongan Dioecesis Boronganensis Diyosesis han Borongan Diyosesis ng Borongan

Catholic
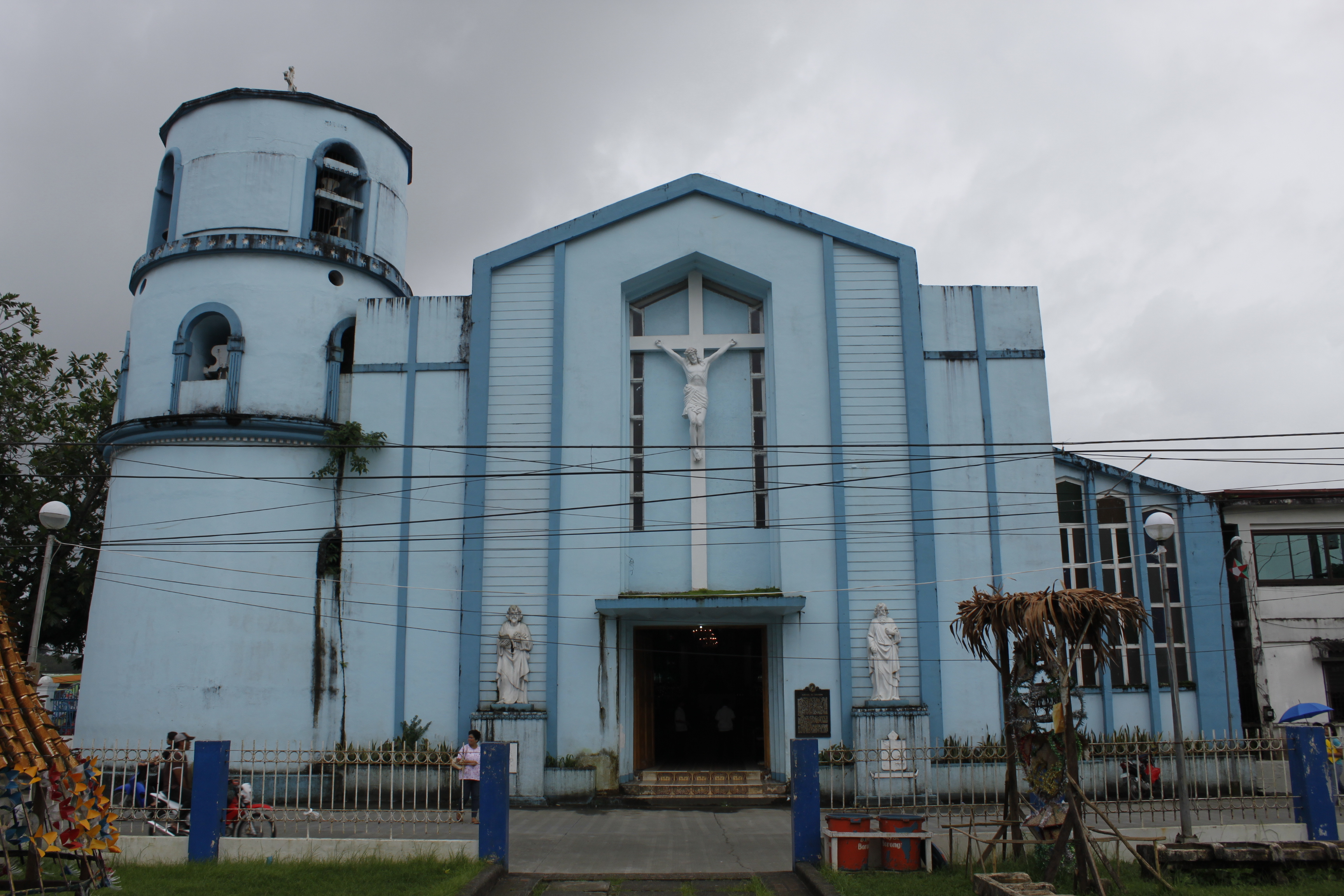
- Borongan Cathedral

- Coat of arms

Location
- Country: Philippines
- Territory: Eastern Samar
- Ecclesiastical province: Palo

Statistics
- Area: 4,339 km^{2} (1,675 sq mi)
- Population: Total; Catholics: (as of 2021); 496,000; 491,000 (99%)
- Parishes: 33

Information
- Denomination: Catholic Church
- Sui iuris church: Latin Church
- Rite: Roman Rite
- Established: 22 October 1960
- Cathedral: Cathedral of the Nativity of the Blessed Virgin Mary
- Secular priests: 70

Current leadership
- Pope: Leo XIV
- Bishop: Sede vacante
- Metropolitan Archbishop: John F. Du
- Vicar General: Lope C. Robredillo
- Episcopal Vicars: Dan Gañas; Leroy Geli; Joberto Picardal

The Diocese of Borongan (Lat: Dioecesis Boronganensis) is a Latin Church ecclesiastical jurisdiction or diocese of the Catholic Church in the Philippines. Created on October 22, 1960, by Pope John XXIII from territory of the Diocese of Calbayog, the diocese is a suffragan in the ecclesiastical province of the metropolitan Archdiocese of Palo.

== Structure ==
Bishop Vicente Reyes was the first diocesan bishop. On June 19, 1965, the island of Samar was politically divided and the province of Eastern Samar was born. Thus the island of Samar has three dioceses: Calbayog for Western Samar, Catarman for Northern Samar and Borongan for Eastern Samar.

Eastern Samar has a population of 374,255 of which 97 percent are Catholic. It is subdivided into one city and 22 municipalities. It has a land area of 4,470.75 square kilometers. It is bounded on the north by Northern Samar, on the east by the Philippine Sea, on the west by Western Samar and on the south by Leyte Gulf.

The Diocese of Borongan is divided into three regions, and each has two vicariates. The episcopal see is Borongan. The diocese has experienced no jurisdictional changes since being erected.

Crispin Barrete Varquez was appointed its bishop on August 4, 2007.

== Ordinaries ==
No.	Picture	Name	From	Until	Coat of arms
1st		Vicente P. Reyes	19 January 1961 (appointed)	8 August 1967 (deceased, emeritus bishop of Cabanatuan)	
2nd		Godofredo Pisig Pedernal	26 February 1968 (appointed)	18 September 1976 (resigned)	
3rd		Sincero Barcenilla Lucero	8 March 1977 (appointed)	10 December 1979 (emeritus bishop of Calbayog)	
4th		Nestor Celestial Cariño	12 August 1980 (appointed)	31 January 1986 (resigned)	
5th		Leonardo Yuzon Medroso	18 December 1980 (appointed)	31 January 2006 (retired, bishop emeritus of Tagbilaran)	
6th		Crispin Barrete Varquez	4 August 2007 (appointed)	10 September 2026 (appointed Bishop of Tagbilaran)	

Former coat of arms of the Diocese of Borongan, depicting actual wounds instead of gout-de-sang

== Beatification launch ==
On 8 December 1995, the Parish Church of the Immaculate Conception, Guiuan formally launched a beatification movement for Donato Guimbaolibot, coinciding with the town fiesta and the celebration of the 400th anniversary of the town's Christian evangelization to the Vatican Council.

== See also ==
- Catholic Church in the Philippines
