= Baclayon Church =

Roman Catholic church in Bohol, Philippines

- Immaculate Conception Parish Church
- Iglesia Parroquial de La Purísima Concepción de la Virgen María (Spanish)
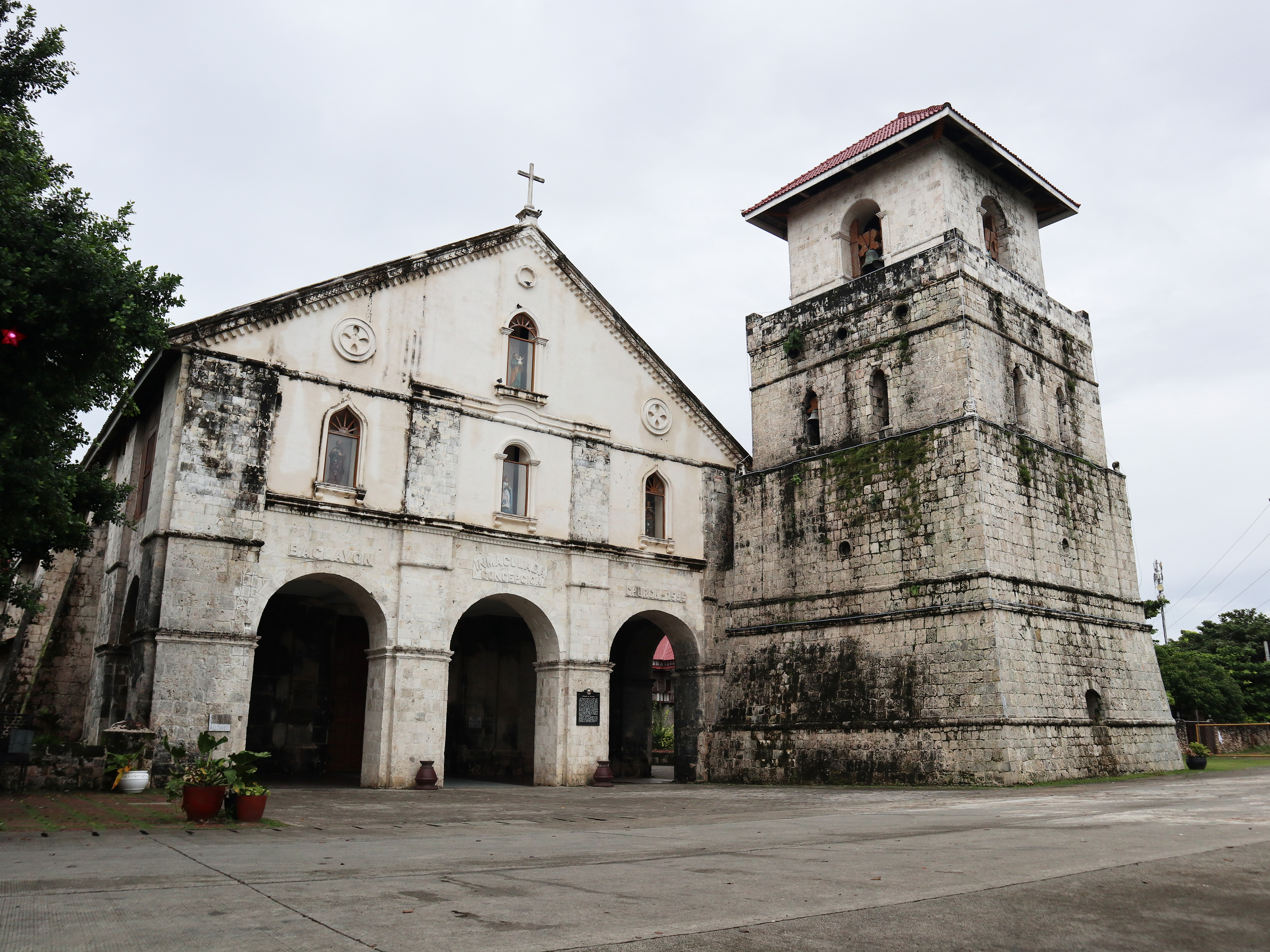
- The church in January 2023

- Location in the Visayas Location in the Philippines
- 9°37′22″N 123°54′44″E
- Location: Baclayon, Bohol
- Country: Philippines
- Denomination: Catholic

History
- Status: Parish church
- Founded: 1596; 1717 (as Parish)
- Founder(s): Fr. Juan de Torres, SJ; Fr. Gabriel Sanchez, SJ
- Dedication: Immaculate Conception
- Consecrated: 1727; 299 years ago

Architecture
- Functional status: Active
- Heritage designation: National Cultural Treasure
- Architectural type: Church building
- Style: Baroque
- Years built: 1727, 2014–2018
- Groundbreaking: 2014; 12 years ago (restoration)
- Completed: February 27, 2018; 8 years ago (restoration)

Specifications
- Materials: Coral stones

Administration
- Province: Cebu
- Diocese: Tagbilaran
- Deanery: Assumption of Our Lady
- Parish: Immaculate Concepcion

Clergy
- Priest(s): Fr. Vicente Mathias M. Nunag, III

National Historical Landmarks
- Designated: July 27, 1994
- Legal Basis: Resolution No. 3, s. 1994

National Cultural Treasures
- Designated: 2010

Immaculate Conception Parish Church, (formally: La Purísima Concepción de la Virgen María Parish Church) and informally called Baclayon Church, is a Roman Catholic church in the municipality of Baclayon, Bohol, Philippines within the jurisdiction of the Diocese of Tagbilaran. Baclayon was founded by the Jesuit priest Juan de Torres and Gabriel Sánchez in 1596, and became the oldest Christian settlement in Bohol. It was elevated as a parish in 1717 and the present coral stone church was completed in 1727. The Augustinian Recollects succeeded the Jesuits in 1768 and heavily renovated the church since then.

The church was declared a National Cultural Treasure by the National Museum of the Philippines and a National Historical Landmark by the National Historical Commission of the Philippines. Together with the churches of Maragondon, Loboc and Guiuan, the Baclayon Church was formerly included for the UNESCO World Heritage Tentative List of the Philippines since 1993 under the collective group of Jesuit Churches of the Philippines. When a 7.2 magnitude earthquake struck Bohol and other parts of Central Visayas in 2013, the church building sustained major damage. It was reconstructed by the National Historical Commission of the Philippines from 2014 to 2018.

== History ==
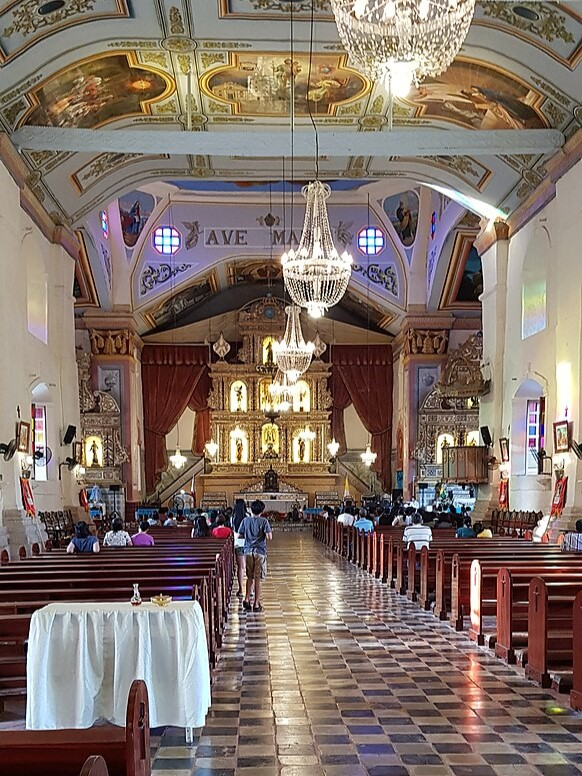
The nave of the church

The Jesuits were the first evangelizers of Baclayon, planting the first seeds of Christianity in Bohol upon the request of Doña Catalina de Bolaños, mother of the encomendero of Bohol island, Pedro de Gamboa to Father Antonio Sedeño, mission superior of Leyte and Samar. On November 17, 1596, the first Jesuits, Father Juan de Torres, SJ and Father Gabriel Sánchez, SJ, came to Baclayon. At that time, a Catholic chapel is already existing inside the encomienda.

In 1717, Baclayon was elevated to a parish. The present stone church constructed under the Jesuits and finished in 1727. When the Jesuits were expelled in the country in 1768, the Augustinian Recollects immediately succeeded them in the late part of the same year in administering the spiritual needs of the people of Baclayon. Renovations on the church was done during the administration of Father Pedro de la Encarnación, OAR (1839–1854), Father Antonio Úbeda, OAR (1856–1859, 1861–1868) and Father José María Cabañas, OAR (1870–1898). The church was saved from destruction during the Philippine–American War in exchange for food and water in 1901. During the Second World War, the church suffered damage but was later restored. From being part of Baclayon, Balilihan, Alburquerque, Corella and Sikatuna became independent parishes in 1829, 1869, 1884 and 1914 respectively. Although it survived damages and was eventually restored, the church of Baclayon was heavily damaged when an earthquake struck Bohol on October 15, 2013.

=== Historical and cultural declarations ===
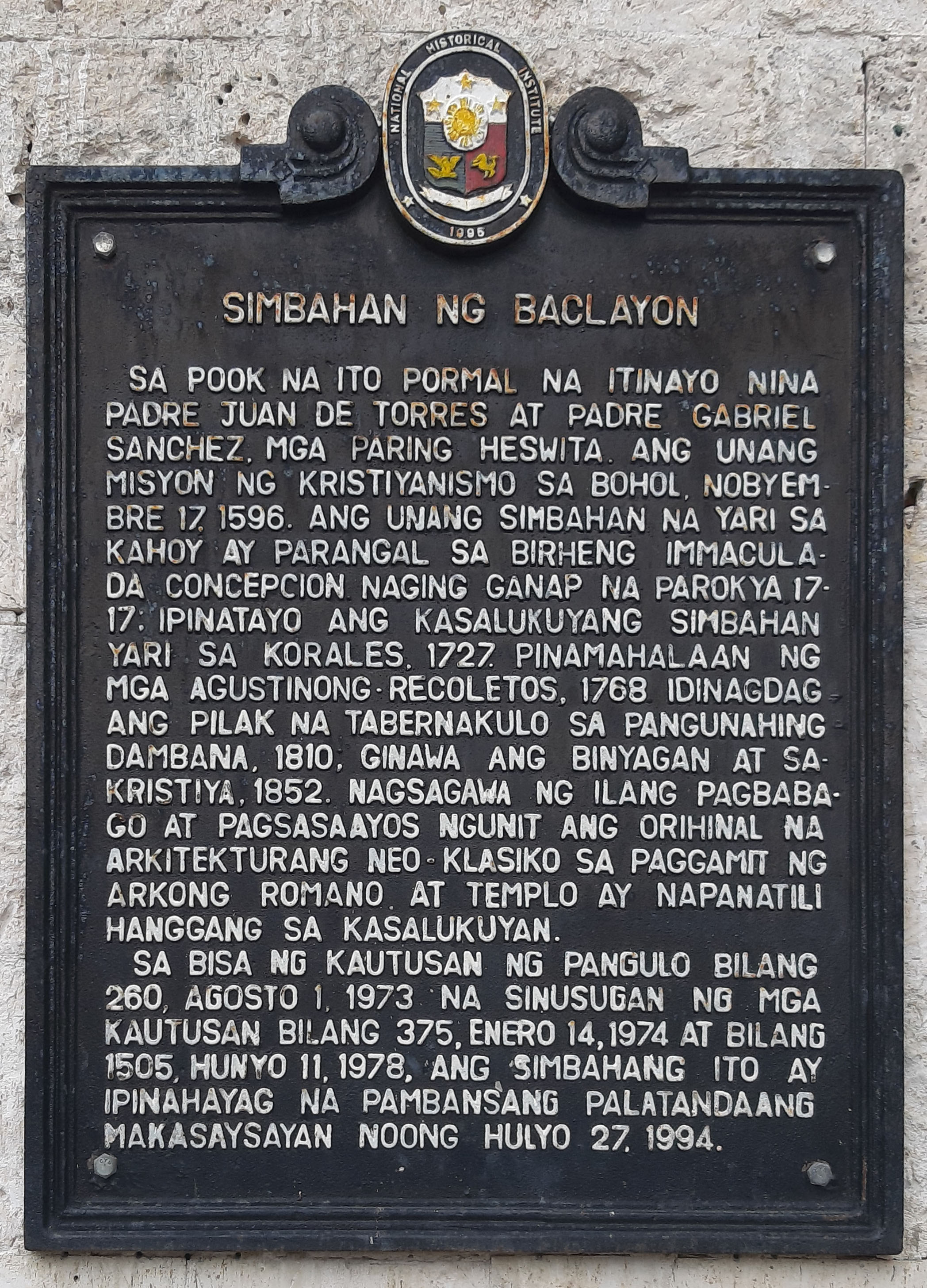
Church NHI historical marker installed in 1995

Baclayon Church was declared a National Cultural Treasure by the National Museum of the Philippines in 2010. The National Historical Institute, now National Historical Commission of the Philippines, also declared Baclayon Church a National Historical Landmark on July 27, 1994. It was considered for addition to the UNESCO World Heritage Sites of the Philippines under the collective group of the Jesuit Churches of the Philippines with the churches of Maragondon in Cavite, Loboc in Bohol and Guiuan in Eastern Samar. However, due to its total destruction, it was removed as a nominated site.

=== 2013 earthquake and restoration ===
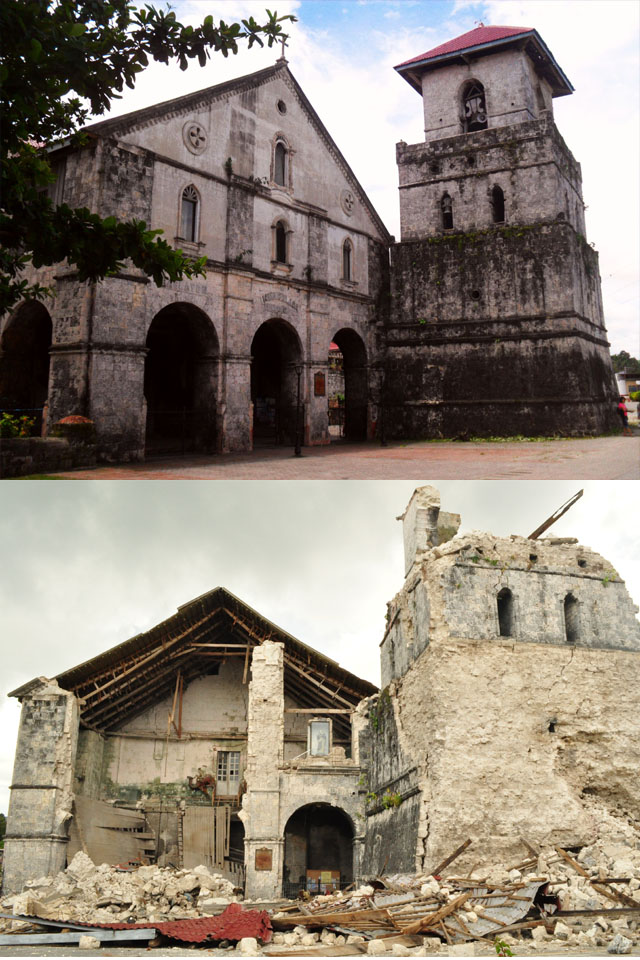
The church before and after the 2013 earthquake

On October 15, 2013, a strong earthquake heavily damaged the church and several other churches designated as National Cultural Treasures. The church sustained major damage with its collapsed portico and bell tower.

The Diocese of Tagbilaran restored the Church of Baclayon and all other churches destroyed by the earthquake. Together with government agencies, pre-restoration works were made. The church was reopened to the public on February 27, 2018.

== Features ==
The church, built out of coral stones, is a cross-shaped (cruciform) church with its juncture or crossing surmounted by a pyramidal wall. The original tiled roof was replaced by galvanized iron in 1893. The church complex is strategically located facing the sea. It originally has defensive stone walls around but was removed in the 1870s. It also has a school building built out of coral stones in the middle of the 19th century. A wood and stone market was built in 1881.

=== Façade ===
Prior to restoration the original façade, oriented southwest and located behind the portico, was built together with the stone church of the Jesuits in 1727. It is simply designed, its upper half hidden by an extended choir loft which houses an 1824 pipe organ. A way of glazed blue tiles connects the façade and portico, which was added in 1875 as an extension to the façade by the Augustinian Recollects. An inscription on the portico's pediment showing the year of the façades construction (1875) was invisible due to renovations. Two images, both dated 1885, are found on the portico niches: Saint Joseph and the Child Jesus in the uppermost niche, and the Immaculate Conception, the church's titular, in the central niche.

Just like the façade, the walls of the church were simply decorated with icons of cherubim, mostly their heads and wings.

=== Interior ===
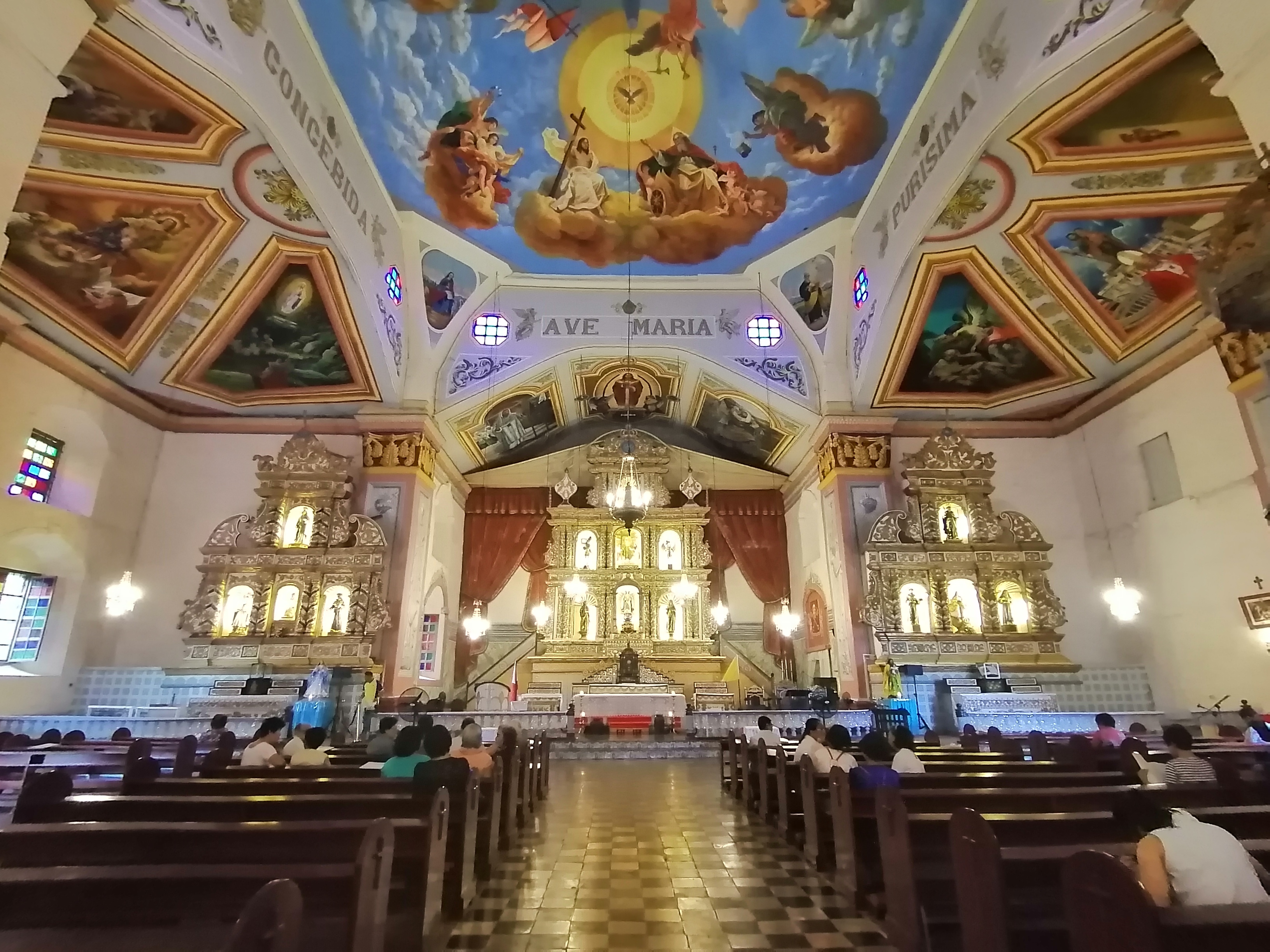
Church nave and sanctuary in 2019

The church entrance is flanked by an arcade leading to the narthex. The entrance to the choir loft and some carosa (processional carriage) for images of saints are found on the right and left side of the narthex, respectively. Since the floor inside is lower than the ground outside, a new floor made of wood (particularly molave) was installed in 1852 which was later replaced by brick tiles from 1874 to 1875.

Reddish paintings on wooden panels commissioned by Father Antonio Úbeda from 1856 to 1859 can be found inside the church. These are the Ascension of Our Lord and Pentecost on the doorway; and two portraits of the Doctors of the Church. A third portrait belonging to the set of Doctors of the Church is on the church museum while the fourth portrait is lost. The paintings Agony in the Garden and Crowning of Thorns, also commissioned by Father Úbeda, is currently housed at the San Agustin Museum in Intramuros, Manila. The works of art are done by Liberato Gachalian.

Murals, mostly replaced by monochromatic tin sheets, were also present on the church's ceilings. Though most ceiling paintings were unpreserved, an original work of Max Aya-ay in 1957 can still be seen on portions of the crossing. The walls were originally adorned with wooden images of Stations of the Cross commissioned by Father Úbeda in 1859 which were later replaced by European-made images.

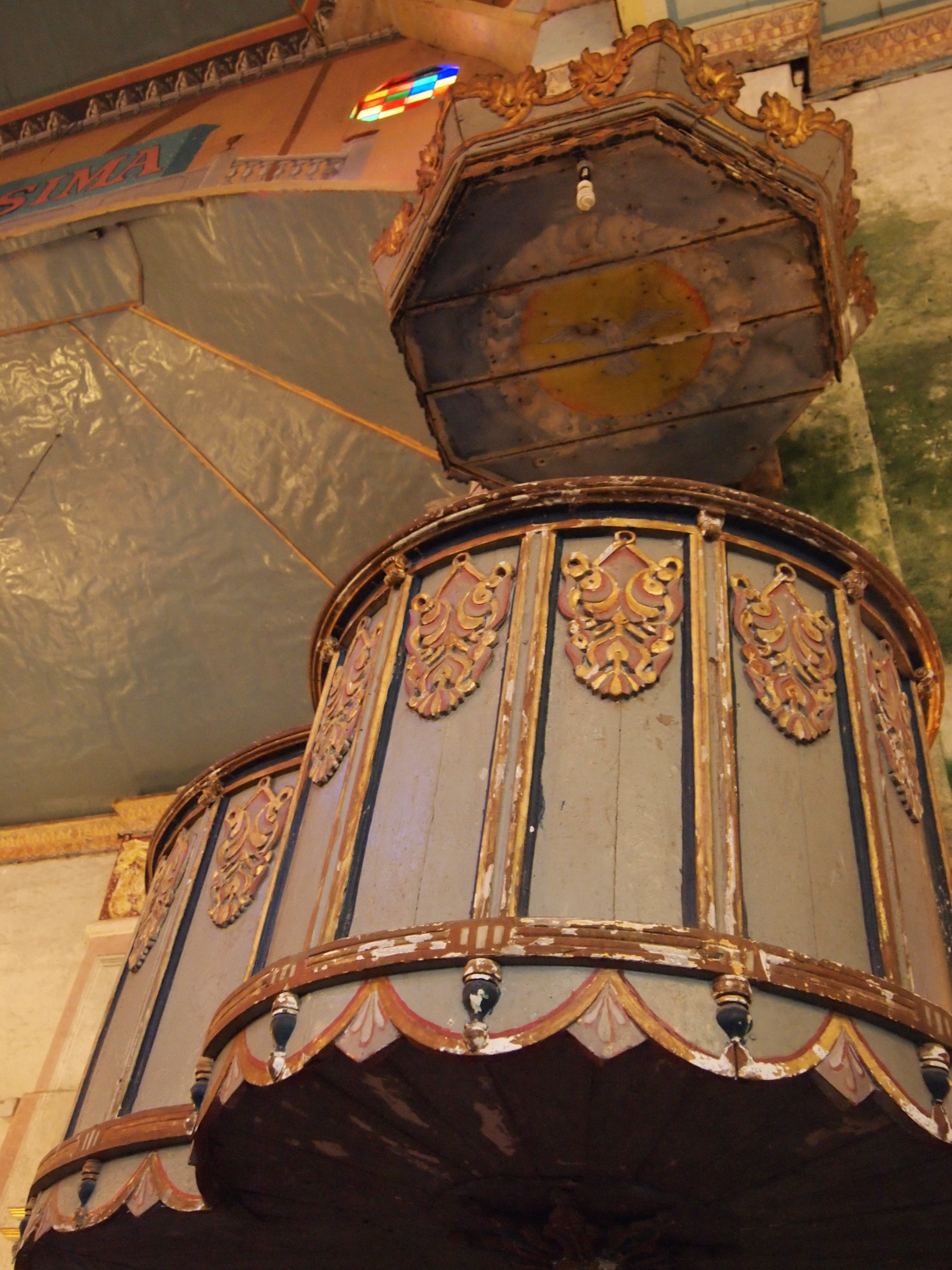
Pulpit

A Baroque and Neoclassical pulpit made in the 1870s is located on the right (epistle) side of the church, facing the altar. Its abat-voix (sounding board) has an image of the Holy Ghost in a gloriole painted on the underside. Connected to the convent is the tribuna, a private area for guests and visiting priests on the epistle side. A silver sanctuary lamp, dated 1835 and additional details such as sconce added in 1874, hangs in the crossing.

=== Altar and retablo ===
The church has three retablos, one retablo mayor (central or major reredos) and two other side altars. The retablo mayor is inscribed with the Jesuit motto, Ad maiorem Dei gloriam, suggesting the Society may have had the altar made. On the altar's center, a medallion with the anagram of the Blessed Virgin Mary can be seen which may be originally the Jesuit seal. It contains 18th and 19th century images of Saint Joseph on the uppermost level; Holy Trinity (center), Saint Michael and Saint Gabriel on the middle level; with the Immaculate Conception enshrined in the main niche (center), flanked by her parents Saint Anne and Saint Joachim. In 1810, a silver tabernacle was added to the altar.

Above the altar is a painting depicting the Last Supper and a Spanish inscription dedicated to the Virgin Mary.

Altars of Baclayon Church

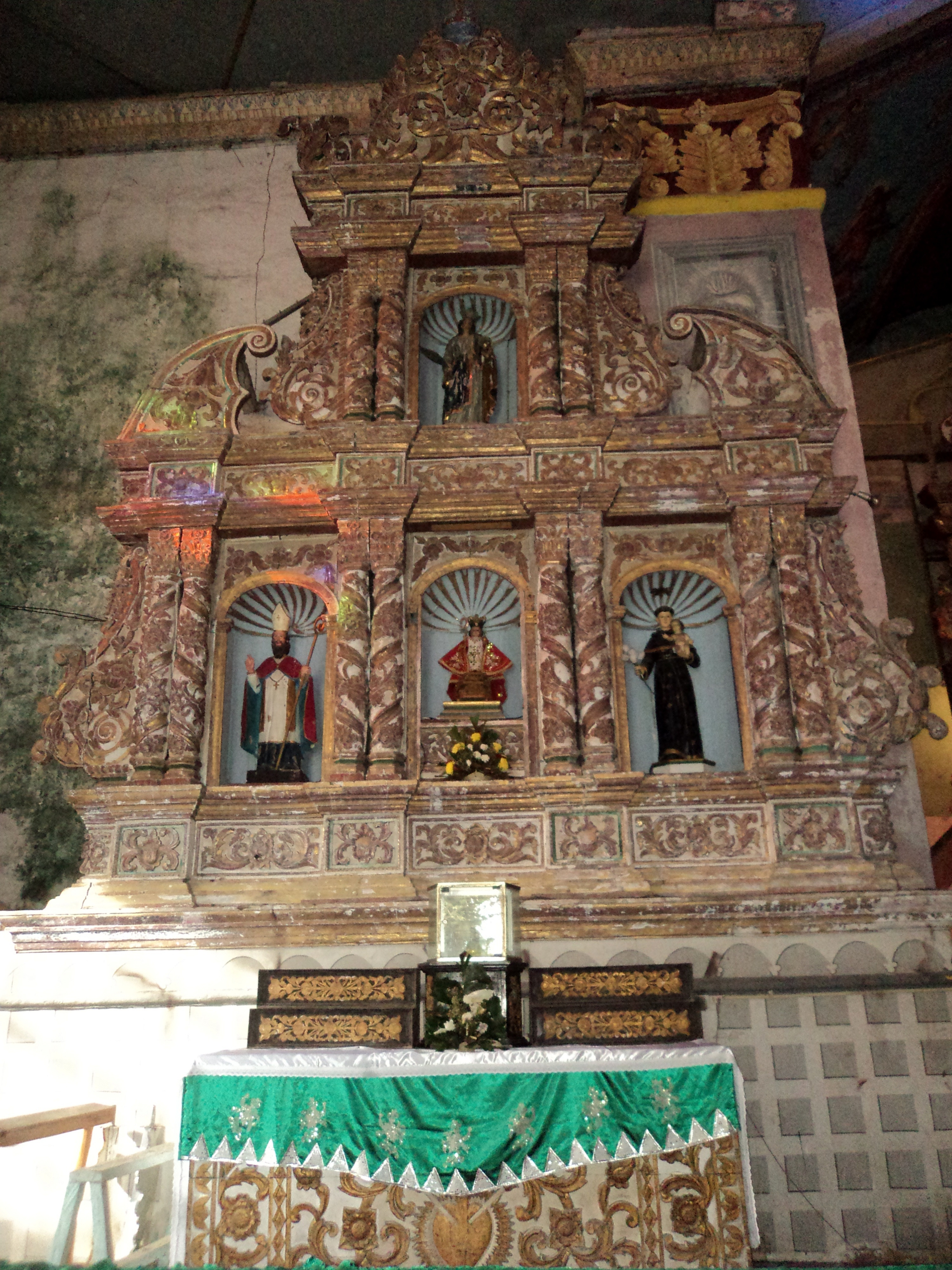
Gospel retablo

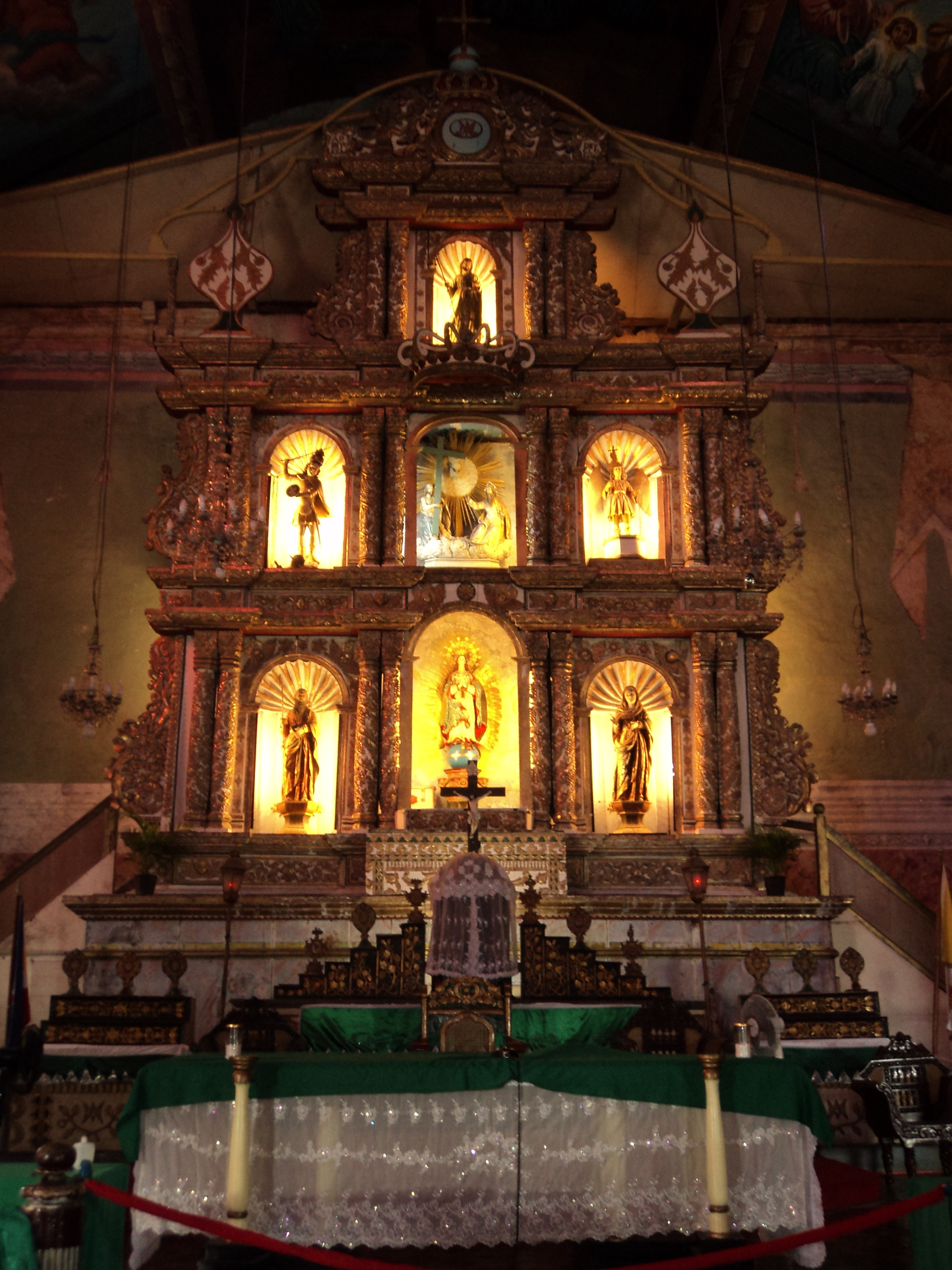
Retablo mayor

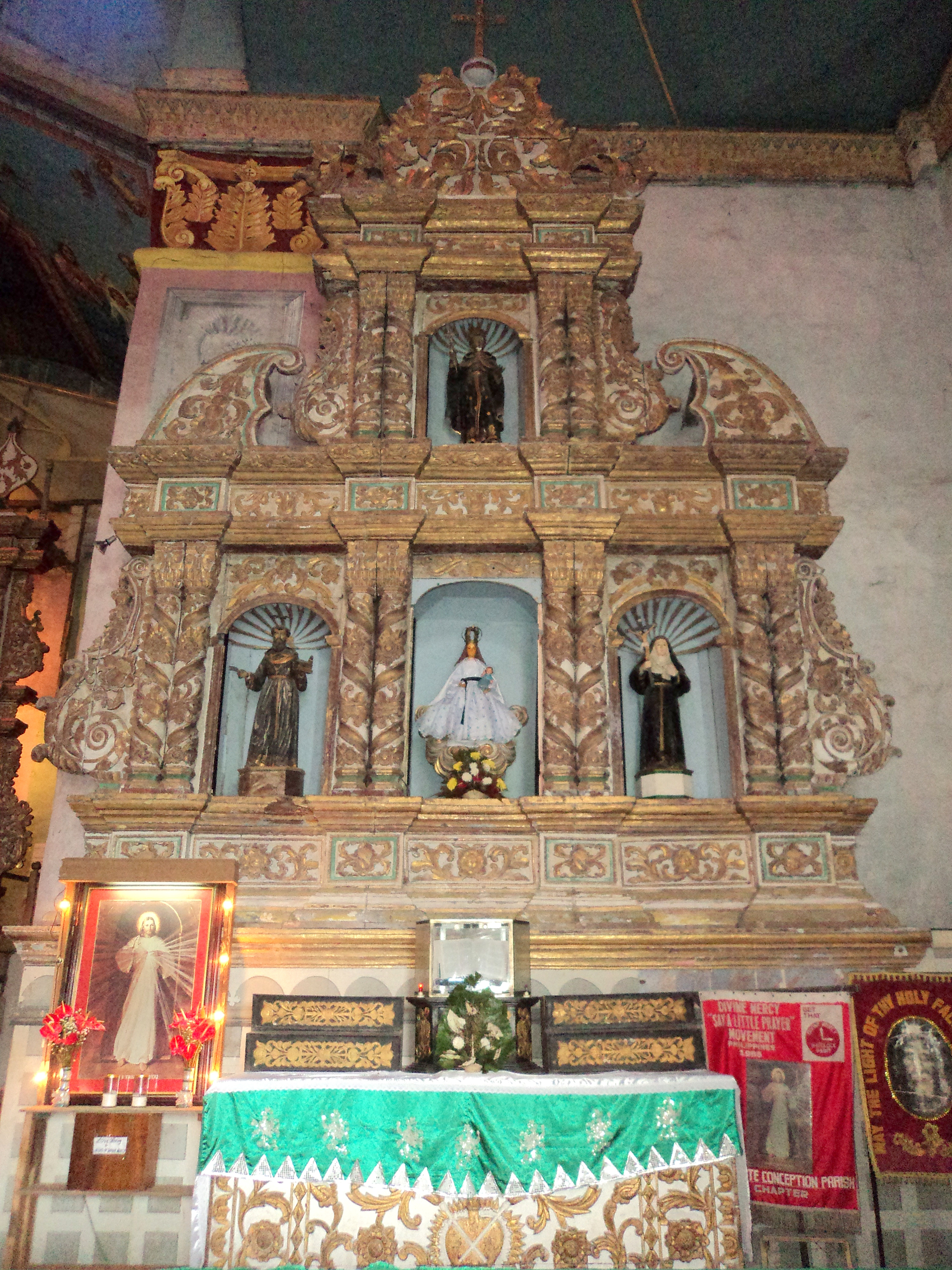
Epistle retablo

==== Gospel retablo ====
The side altar located on the left hand side facing the altar is consecrated to the Santo Niño. Joining the statue of the Holy Child are 19th century images of Saint Anthony of Padua and Saint Blaise; and Saint Lucy on the topmost level. Another smaller neoclassical retablo housing a 19th-century image of Saint Mary Magdalene is located on the left side of the gospel retablo.

==== Epistle retablo ====
The opposite side altar on the right side houses another early 19th century image of the Nuestra Señora de la Consolación (Our Lady of Consolation) in the central niche. Joining the Marian image are Augustinian Saints: Saint Augustine, Saint Monica and Saint Nicolas de Tolentino. On the right is a smaller neoclassical retablo built in 1875, housing the image of Saint Joseph in the main niche and Saint Isidore.

=== Baptistry ===
An octagonal baptistry connected to the near the altar of Saint Mary Magdalene in the gospel transept was constructed in 1853. Inside the baptistry is an earlier image of San Juan Bautista, a baptismal font and an unusual retablo built in 1852 housing the Santo Entierro in a glass coffin and the Nuestra Señora de los Dolores in the central niche.

=== Sacristy ===
Located near the retablo is a large room called the ante-sacristy, a storage room for church utensils and decorations. This room is connected to either the convent or the main sacristy which stores the church's liturgical vestments. Several wooden chests inside the sacristy carries the flaming heart, a symbol of the Augustinian order and okir motifs. The doors leading to both the ante-sacristy and sacristy is similar to the doors of another Jesuit church, the Maragondon Church. The sacristy was also built at that same time with the baptistry in 1852.

=== Convento ===
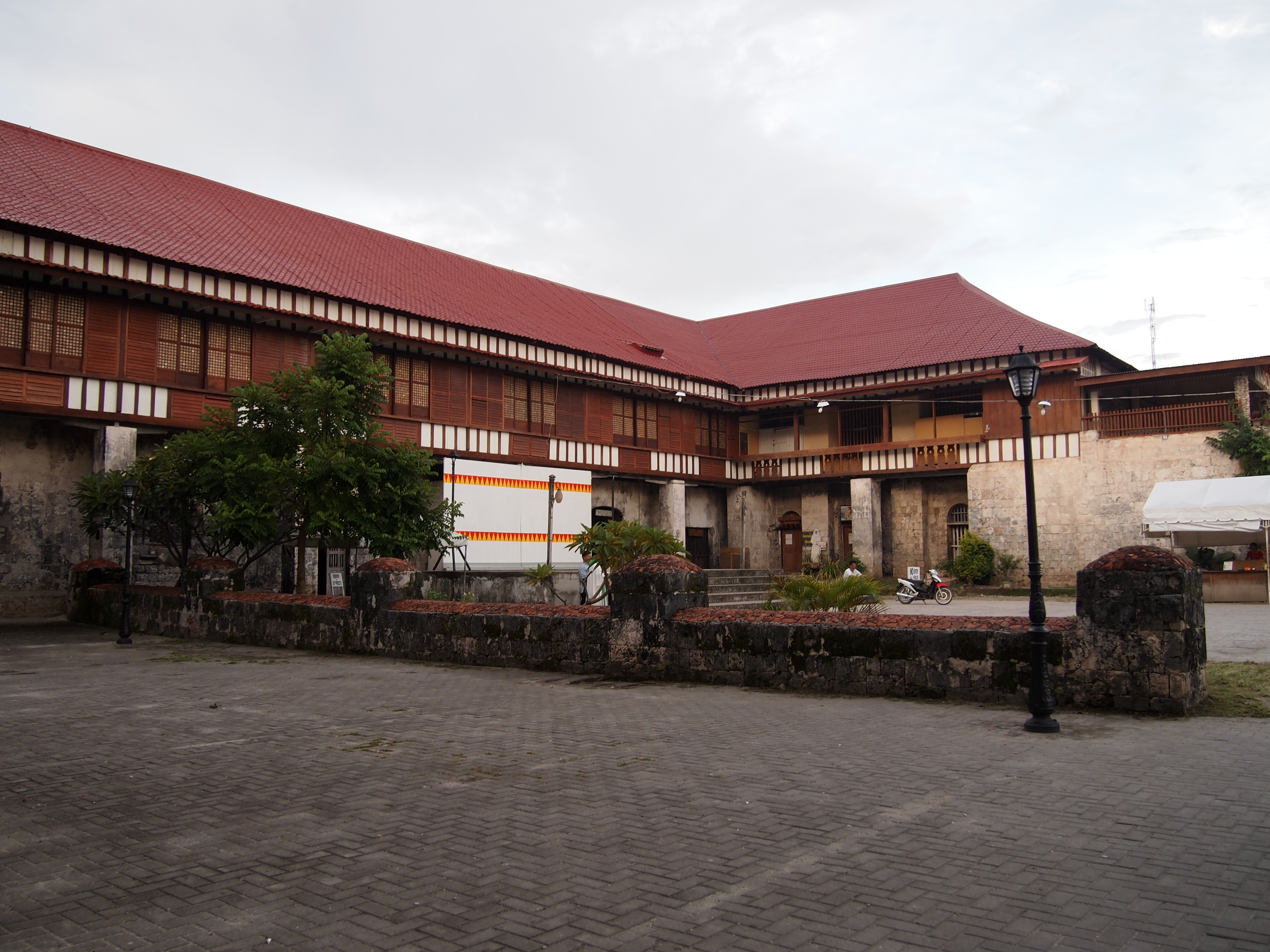
Old convento of Baclayon

The Jesuits left an extension of the epistle transept used as living quarters. In 1872, it was expanded to become a proper convento under Father Cabañas. The convento is a typical bahay-na-bato with its first floor made out of coral stones and egg white mixed with plaster as binder and the second floor made out of light materials like bamboo. The convent which serves as the priest's house, it is much used as the church's ecclesiastical museum.

Other structures around the convent are the Jesuit-built bastion, remnants of an old fortification and a bakery behind the convent which processes egg yolk (unused from using egg as binder in construction of building) into broas (ladyfingers/sponge-fingers).

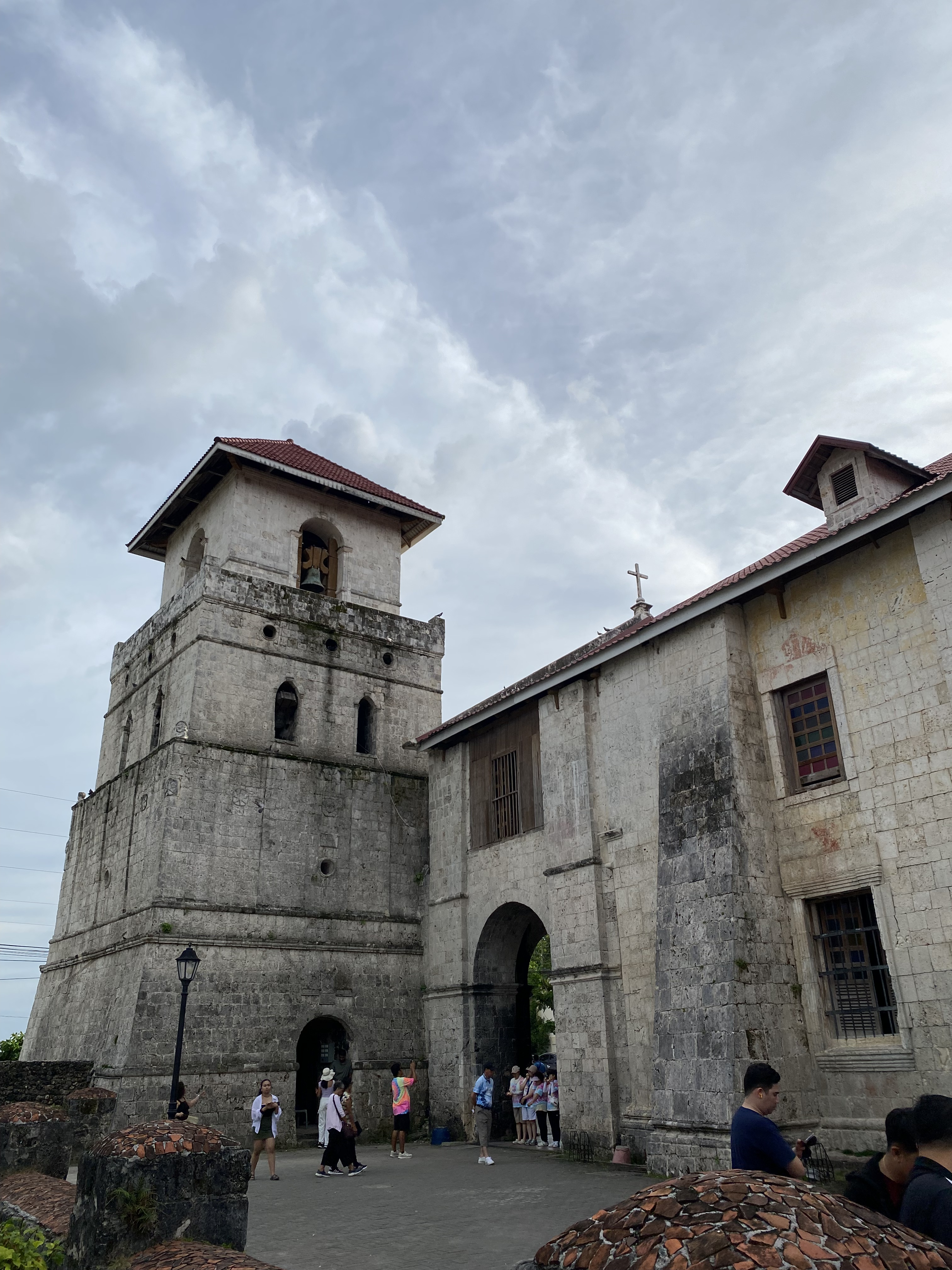
Belltower and right side of church

=== Watchtower ===
The quadrangular watchtower, which was also the church's bell tower, was left unfinished by the Jesuits when they were expelled out of the country. The Augustinian Recollects, who succeeded the Jesuits, completed the watchtower. It is used to be a detached structure from the church and was connected after the addition of the portico. Made of coral stones, it also has a bas relief of Saint Andrew with an inscription of the date the tower was finished during Father San Andrés de la Santísima Trinidad's administration, May 20, 1777. It still has the original six out of the nine bells from 1880 to 1894 during Father Cabañas' terms. The seventh bell (1886) is in the church museum while the eight bell (1872) was given to the then newly founded parish of Corella.

=== Mortuary chapel ===
Near the baptistery is a separate rectangular mortuary chapel (ermita de difuntos) built in 1859. A road from the mortuary chapel leads to the cemetery with stone fences. At the middle of the cemetery is a stone chapel and an ossuary at its back.

== Bibliography ==
- Lim, Charles (2002). Best of Cebu and Bohol. Cebu: AsiaType, Inc. p. 39. ISBN 9789719241515.
- Jose, Regalado Trota (2001). Visita Iglesia Bohol (A Guide to Historic Churches). Manila: National Commission for Culture and the Arts. pp. 22–29. ISBN 9718140166.
- Javellana, Rene (1988). "Angels and Gargoyles of Loboc Church". Philippine Studies. 36 (1): 88–97.
- Raimund Becker-Ritterspach, Melva Rodriguez-Java (2018). Illustrated Manual for the Repair and Maintenance of Spanish period Structures in the Philippines - with detailed Studies from Cebu and Bohol. Cebu City: University of San Carlos Press. ISBN 978-971-539-124-5.
