= Donato Guimbaolibot =

Filipino priest

Monsignor Donato Guimbaolibot
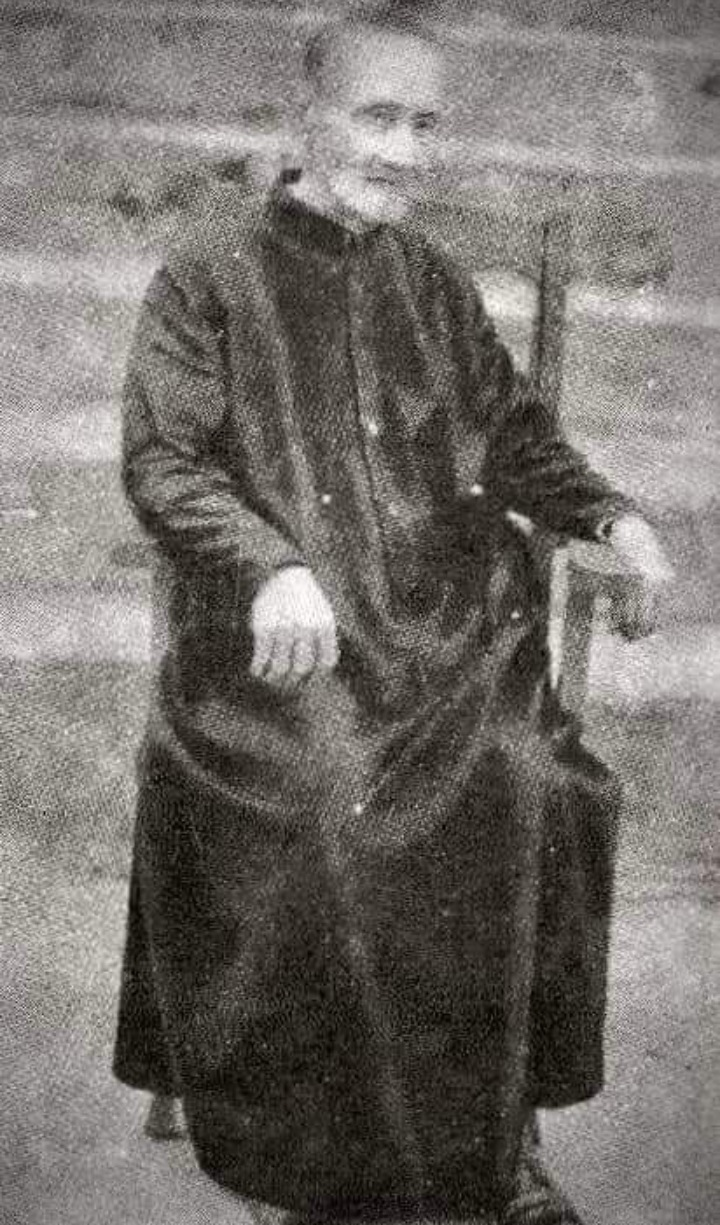
- Old photograph of Msgr. Guimbaolibot
- Church: Roman Catholic Church
- Diocese: Calbayog
- See: Calbayog

Orders
- Ordination: December 27, 1893 by Bp. Martín García y Alcocer

Personal details
- Born: Donato Bago Guimbaolibot; December 5, 1866 Guiuan, Samar, Philippines
- Died: September 9, 1949 (aged 82) Guiuan, Samar, Philippines
- Parents: Tomas Guimbaolibot (father) and Narcisa Bago (mother)
- Education: San Carlos Seminary, Cebu, Philippines

Sainthood
- Venerated in: Roman Catholic Church

Donato Bago Guimbaolibot (December 5, 1866 – September 9, 1949), also known as Padre Atoy, was a Filipino Catholic priest known for his efforts in developing the town of Guiuan in present-day Eastern Samar and for his involvement with the Balangiga Massacre controversies. He is regarded as The Saintly Priest of Balangiga.

== Biography ==
=== Early life ===
Guimbaolibot was born on December 5, 1866, in Guiuan, then in the undivided province of Samar, to Tomas Guimbaolibot and Narcisa Bago. He was the second child and the only son of four, having three sisters: Felipa, the eldest, and Faustina and Maria, the younger ones.

He completed his primary education in Guiuan and, with the support of his parents, he later studied for the priesthood at the San Carlos Seminary in Cebu. He was ordained on December 27, 1893, at the age of 28.

=== Priestly career ===
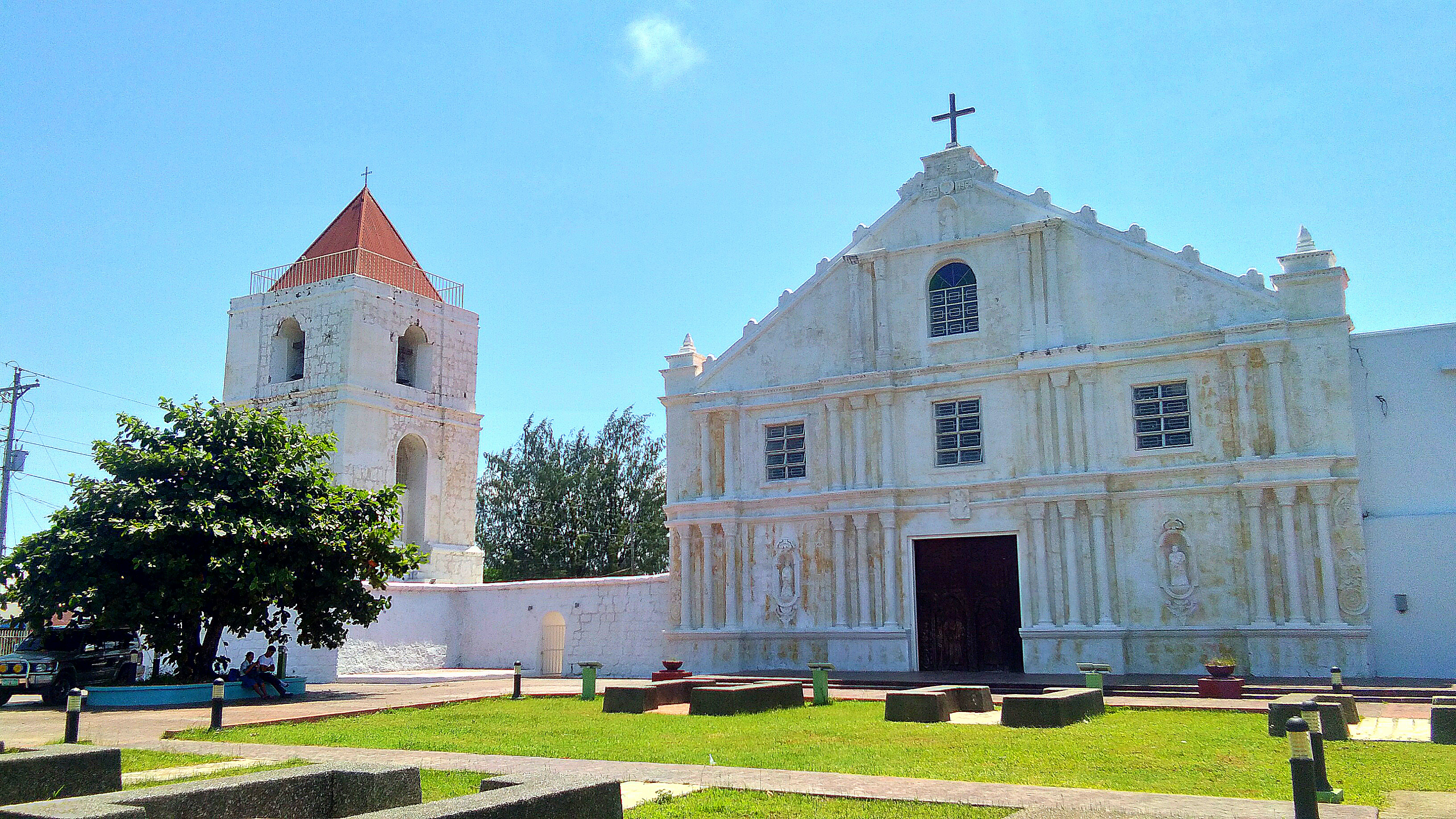
Guimbaolibot's lifelong parish, the Immaculate Conception Church of Guiuan.

Following his ordination, Guimbaolibot served as coadjutor priest in several parishes, including Tanauan in Leyte from November 1898 to May 1899, and later in Balangiga.

It was in Balangiga where he faced a harrowing ordeal, being falsely accused of involvement in the native uprising against American soldiers. He, along with other samareño priests, was subjected to the brutal 'water cure' torture during interrogation in Calbiga. His calm demeanor in prison was said to have inspired his fellow prisoners not to lose hope, and he asked them not to panic but rather to pray. He, together with a few other survivors, were eventually freed after the Americans deferred their sentence.

In 1903, Guimbaolibot was transferred to Guiuan, where he dedicated nearly half a century of his life. At his hometown, his pastoral concerns included the founding of a parochial school for children in 1903, a hospital in 1906, a high school in 1911, the construction of a new convent, and the repair of the historic parish church in the 1930s.

He was elevated to monsignor where he was first-ever priest in the Diocese of Calbayog and was conferred the honorary title of Supernumerary Privy Chamberlain (Domestic Prelate) on January 24, 1930. In 1947, he was paid a visit by Cardinal Francis Spellman.

On January 6, 1949, Guimbaolibot was appointed vicar general by Bishop Miguel Acebedo Flores, a role which he reluctantly accepted. Months later, he died on September 9, 1949. He was remembered as a "silent type of person, devoted to prayer... He lived a pious, humble and simple life... He was offered to become a bishop many times, but he humbly refused all these offers."

Before Guimbaolibot's death, his parishioners included the Russian refugees who were living temporarily in Tubabao Island. According to witnesses, one of them played a violin solo during the internment of the monsignor at the Catholic cemetery of Guiuan on September 14, 1949.

== Legacy ==
The statue of Msgr. Guimbaolibot at Guiuan Church.

=== Monument ===
Guimbaolibot remains the only priest from Samar and Leyte to have a monument built in his honor in his hometown. His monument stands at the western yard of the historic Guiuan Parish Church with the inscription:

"Most Knowledgeable and Most Reverend Monsignor Donato Guimbaolibot Domestic Prelate, Vicar General, Vicar Forane and Parish Priest for 48 years, Immaculate Conception Parish of Guiuan, which he piously and skillfully governed, died at 83 years old on the 9th of September, 1949."

=== Beatification ===
On December 8, 1995, the Parish Church of Guiuan formally launched a beatification movement for Donato Guimbaolibot, coinciding with the town fiesta and the celebration of the 400th anniversary of the town's Christian evangelization. Up to date, the Roman Catholic Dioceses of Borongan and Calbayog has not released any official statement regarding the possibility of formally opening his cause.

=== Cultural references ===
Guimbaolibot is mentioned in Gina Apostol's 2018 novel, Insurrecto, a narrative retelling of the Balangiga massacre by a Filipino translator and an American filmmaker.
