= Loboc Church =

Roman Catholic church in Bohol, Philippines

- San Pedro Apostol Parish Church
- Diocesan Shrine of Our Lady of Guadalupe in Extremadura; Saint Peter the Apostle Parish Church
- Iglesia Parroquial de San Pedro Apóstol y Santuario Diocesano de Nuestra Señora de Guadalupe de Extremadura (Spanish)
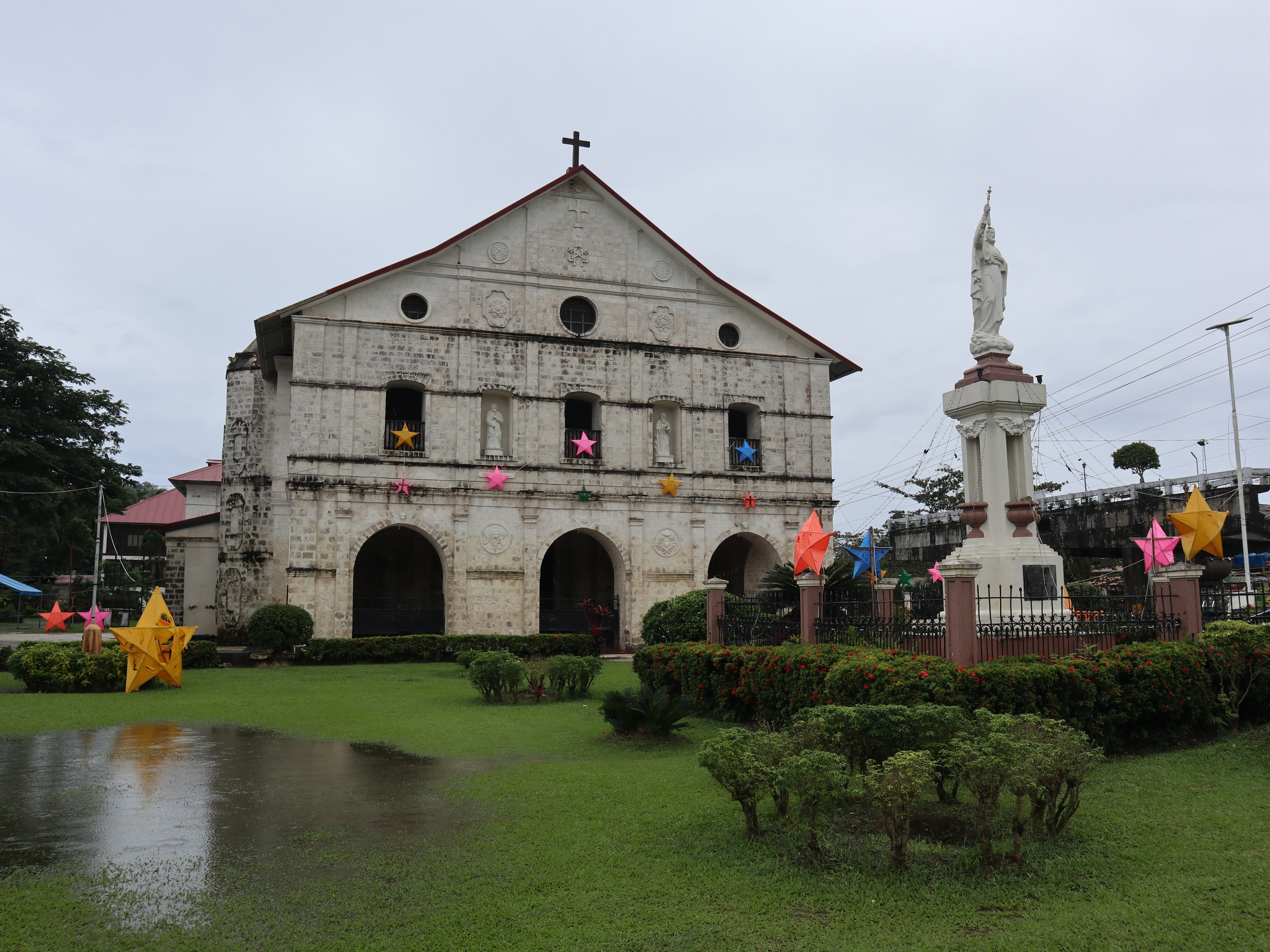
- The church in January 2023, post-restoration following the 2013 Bohol earthquake

- Location in the Visayas Location in the Philippines
- 9°38′10″N 124°01′52″E
- Location: Poblacion, Loboc, Bohol
- Country: Philippines
- Denomination: Roman Catholic

History
- Status: Diocesan Shrine; Parish church
- Founded: 1596; 1602 (as a parish)
- Founder(s): Fr. Juan de Torres, SJ
- Dedication: Saint Peter
- Consecrated: 1734

Architecture
- Functional status: Active
- Heritage designation: National Cultural Treasure
- Designated: July 31, 2001
- Architectural type: Church building
- Style: Baroque
- Years built: 1670–1734 (dst. 2013); 2017–2021
- Groundbreaking: December 2017
- Completed: May 16, 2021

Specifications
- Materials: Coral stones

Administration
- Province: Cebu
- Diocese: Tagbilaran
- Deanery: St. Peter the Apostle
- Parish: St. Peter the Apostle

Clergy
- Priest: Fr. Al John Miñoza

National Historical Landmarks
- Official name: Church of San Pedro Apostol
- Designated: December 12, 1998
- Legal Basis: Resolution No. 7, s. 1998

National Cultural Treasures
- Official name: Parish Church of San Pedro and San Pablo of Loboc
- Designated: July 31, 2001

San Pedro Apostol Parish Church, commonly known as Loboc Church and alternatively as the Diocesan Shrine of Our Lady of Guadalupe in Extremadura, is a Roman Catholic church in the municipality of Loboc, Bohol, Philippines, within the jurisdiction of the Diocese of Tagbilaran.

After the Jesuits established the Christian community in Baclayon, they moved to Loboc and established a second Christian settlement in Bohol. The parish was established in 1602, and the present coral stone church was completed in 1734. Because of its strategic location, it became the center of the Jesuit mission in the Bohol area. In 1768, upon the expulsion of the Jesuits, the town was transferred to the Augustinian Recollects.

The church is classified as a National Historical Landmark by the National Historical Commission of the Philippines and a National Cultural Treasure by the National Museum of the Philippines.

It was severely damaged when a 7.2 magnitude earthquake struck Bohol and other parts of Central Visayas on October 15, 2013. Restoration works began in 2017 and the church was reopened on May 16, 2021.

== History ==
After the establishment of the Jesuit mission in Bohol, Father Juan de Torres, SJ, moved to the community along the Loboc River in late 1596 to establish a second mission station. The first church, made of wood, was built by the people of the area on a site called Calvario, Sawang, near the location of the present-day church. It was dedicated under the patronage of Saint Michael the Archangel. Loboc officially became a parish church in 1602. Due to pirate attacks on Baclayon and the strategic position of Loboc, the Jesuits chose Loboc to become the center of their mission. The Jesuit superior of Bohol later resided in Loboc until the Jesuits' expulsion in 1768. A boarding school for boys, the Seminario de los Indios, was established at Loboc in 1605.

Fire destroyed the original wooden church in 1638; it was later reconstructed by the Jesuit priest Jose Sanchez. A larger church was built in 1670, on the site of the present day convent. The coral stone church was finished in 1734. After the Jesuits were expelled from the country in May 1768, the Augustinian Recollects assumed the administration of the parish and the church that November.

=== Historical and cultural designations ===
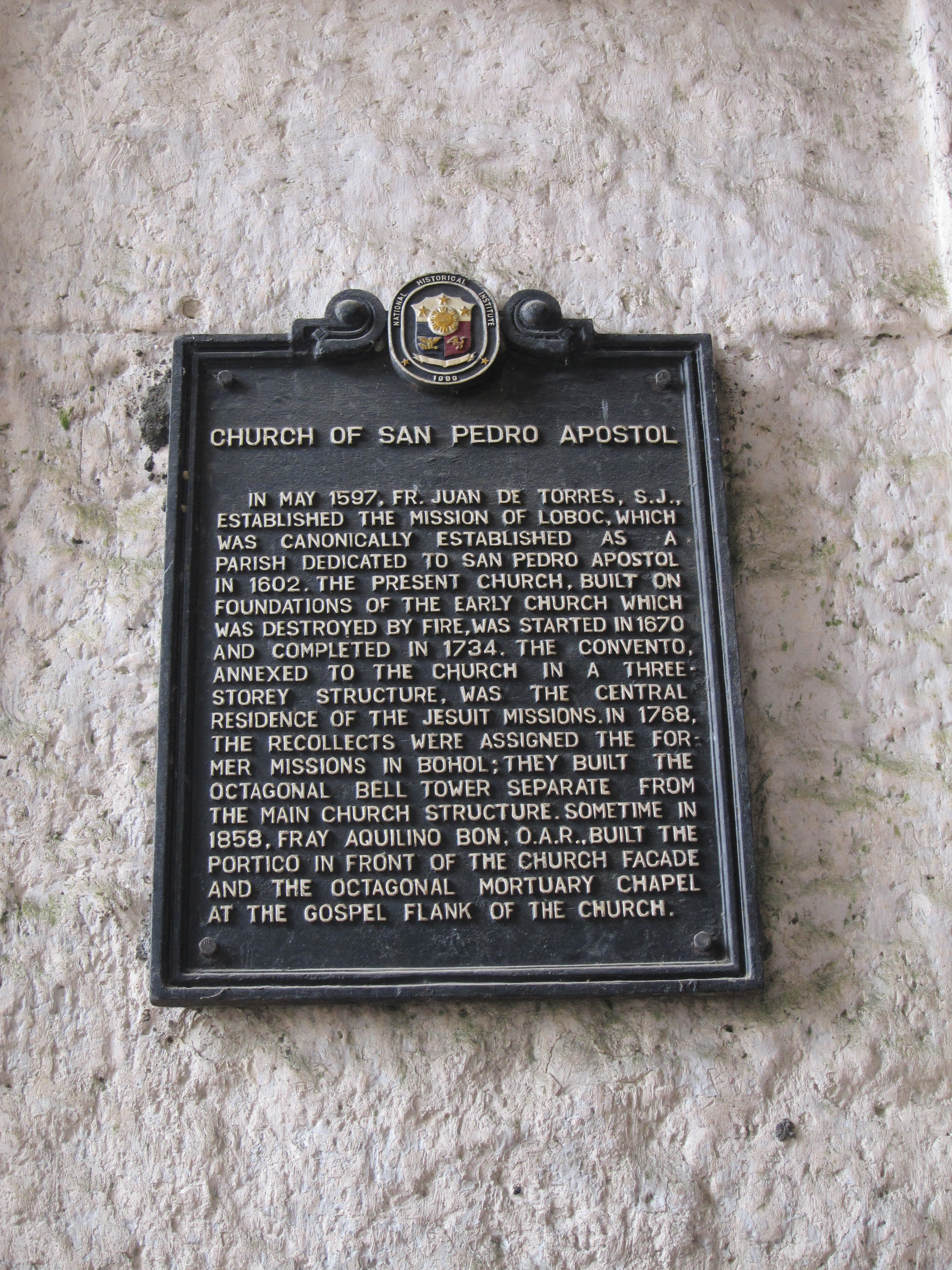
Church NHI historical marker installed in 1999

On December 12, 1998, Loboc Church was declared a National Historical Landmark by the National Historical Institute, now the National Historical Commission of the Philippines. It was also listed as a National Cultural Treasure by the National Museum of the Philippines on July 31, 2001.

The church complex was a candidate for UNESCO World Heritage Sites of the Philippines, under two distinct categories. The Jesuit Churches of the Philippines nomination includes the churches of Maragondon in Cavite, Baclayon in Bohol and Guiuan in Eastern Samar. The Baroque Churches of the Philippines (Extension) nomination, nominates Loboc Church along with the churches of Patrocinio de Maria in Boljoon, Cebu, La Inmaculada Concepcion in Guiuan, Eastern Samar, San Matias in Tumauini, Isabela, and San Isidro Labrador in Lazi, Siquijor. However, due to its total destruction in 2013, it was removed from the roster of nominated sites.

=== 2013 earthquake, restoration, and contemporary history ===
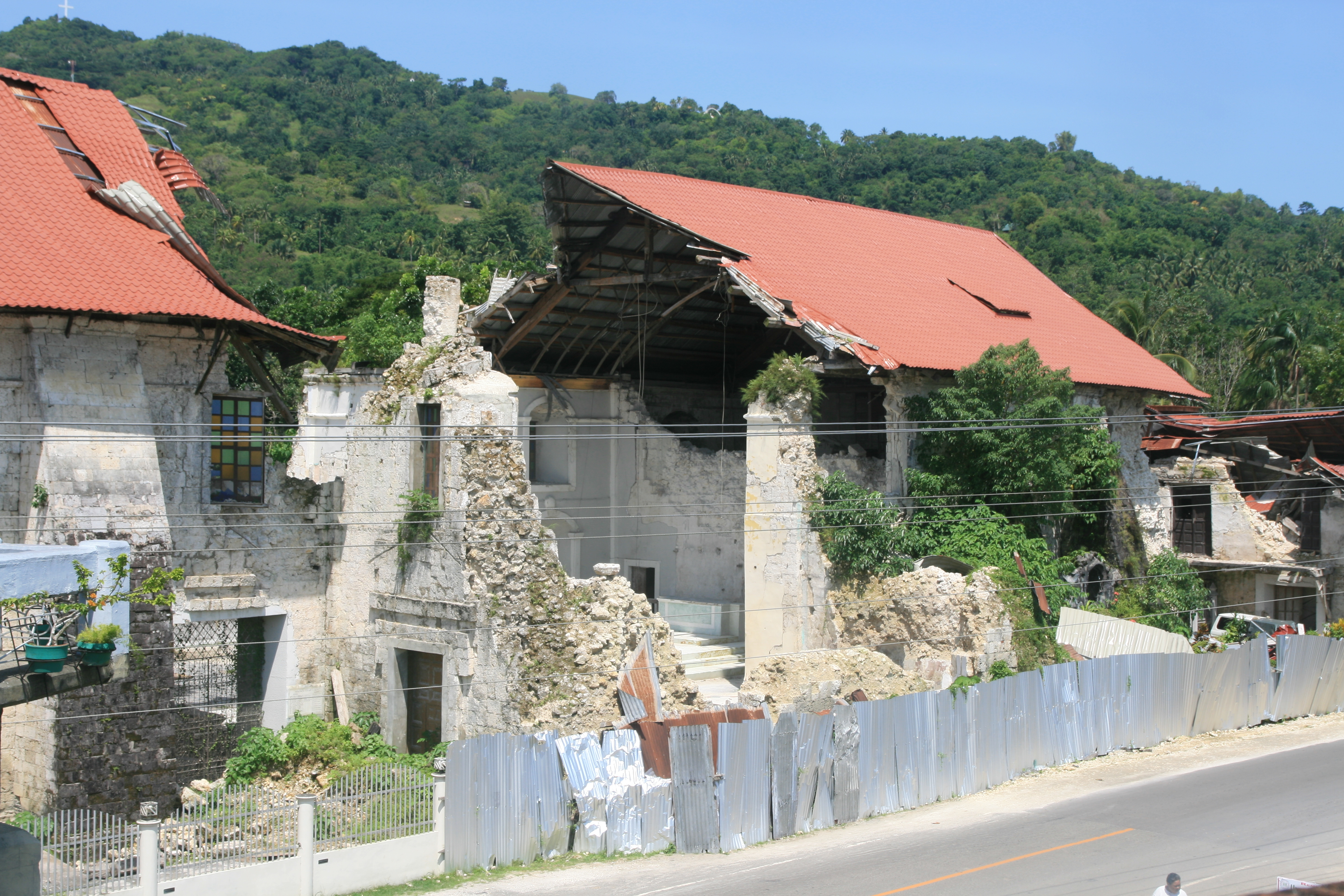
The damaged middle section of the church after the earthquake

On October 15, 2013, a strong earthquake heavily damaged the church and several other churches designated as National Cultural Treasures. The church suffered major damage to its structure, particularly its façade and tower, which both partially collapsed.

While waiting for the complete restoration and rehabilitation of the old church, an alternate church was opened on October 12, 2014.

Restoration works began in 2017. After more than seven years since the earthquake, the National Museum of the Philippines turned over the restored church on May 16, 2021, Ascension Sunday (Note: While the Feast of the Ascension is traditionally celebrated on a Thursday, some countries including the Philippines celebrate it on the following Sunday.), the same day the church was reopened.

On May 24, 2021, the church was declared as the Diocesan Shrine of Our Lady of Guadalupe in Extremadura, the same day that it was also affiliated with the Papal Basilica of Saint Mary Major in Rome. Plenary indulgences were also granted for pilgrims visiting the church.

== Architecture ==
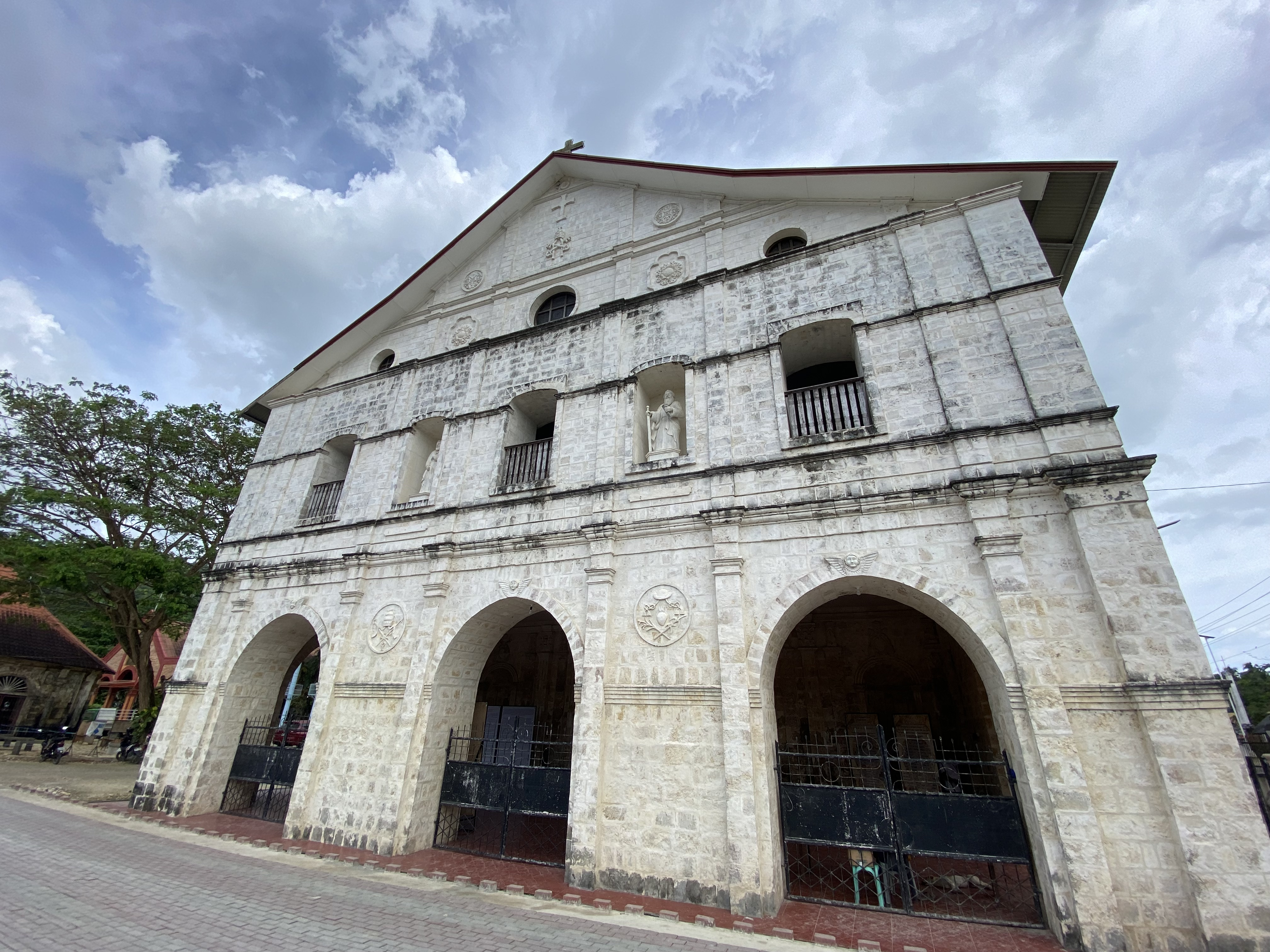
Church façade in 2025

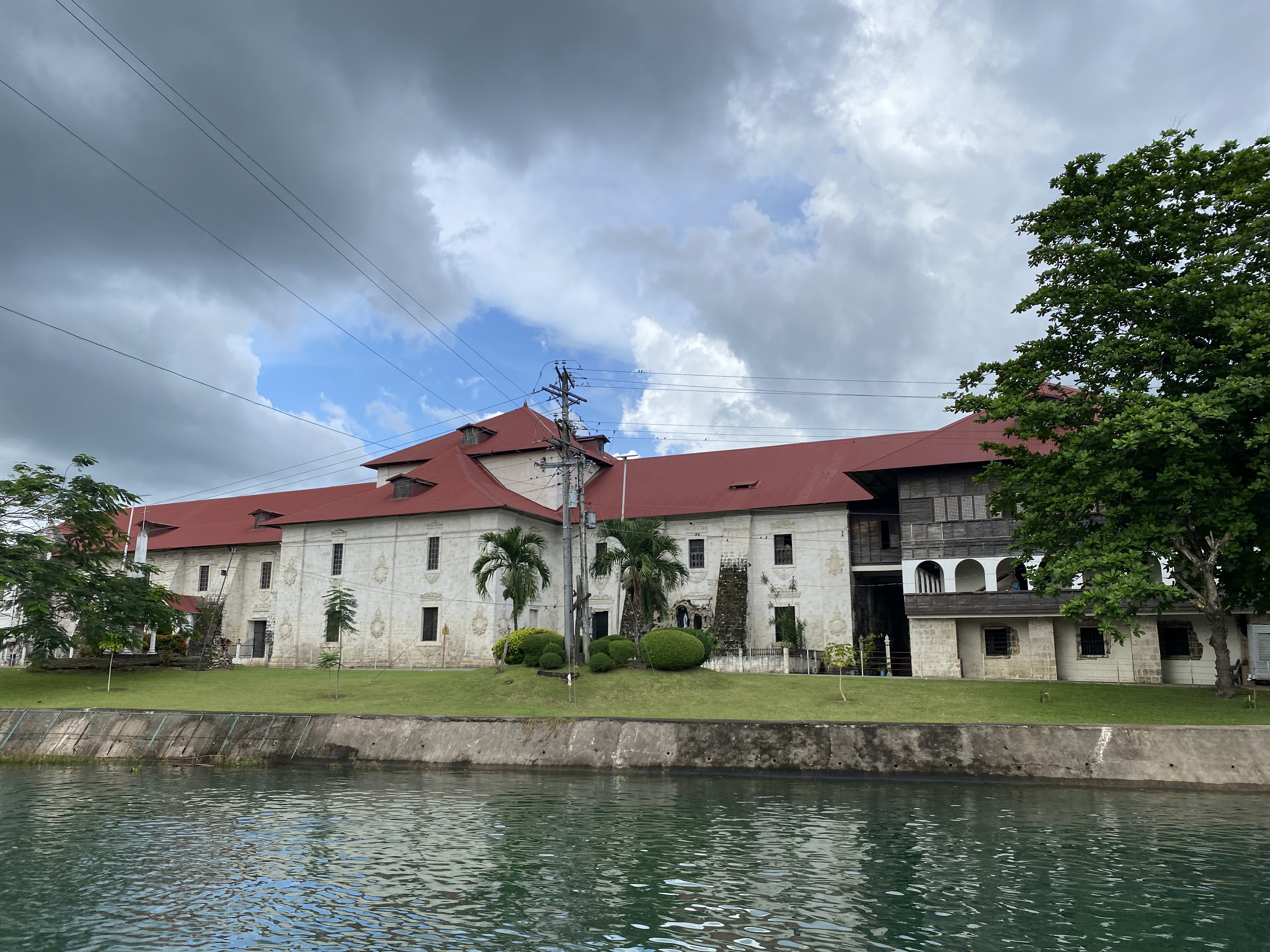
View of the Loboc Church and Convent from the Loboc River

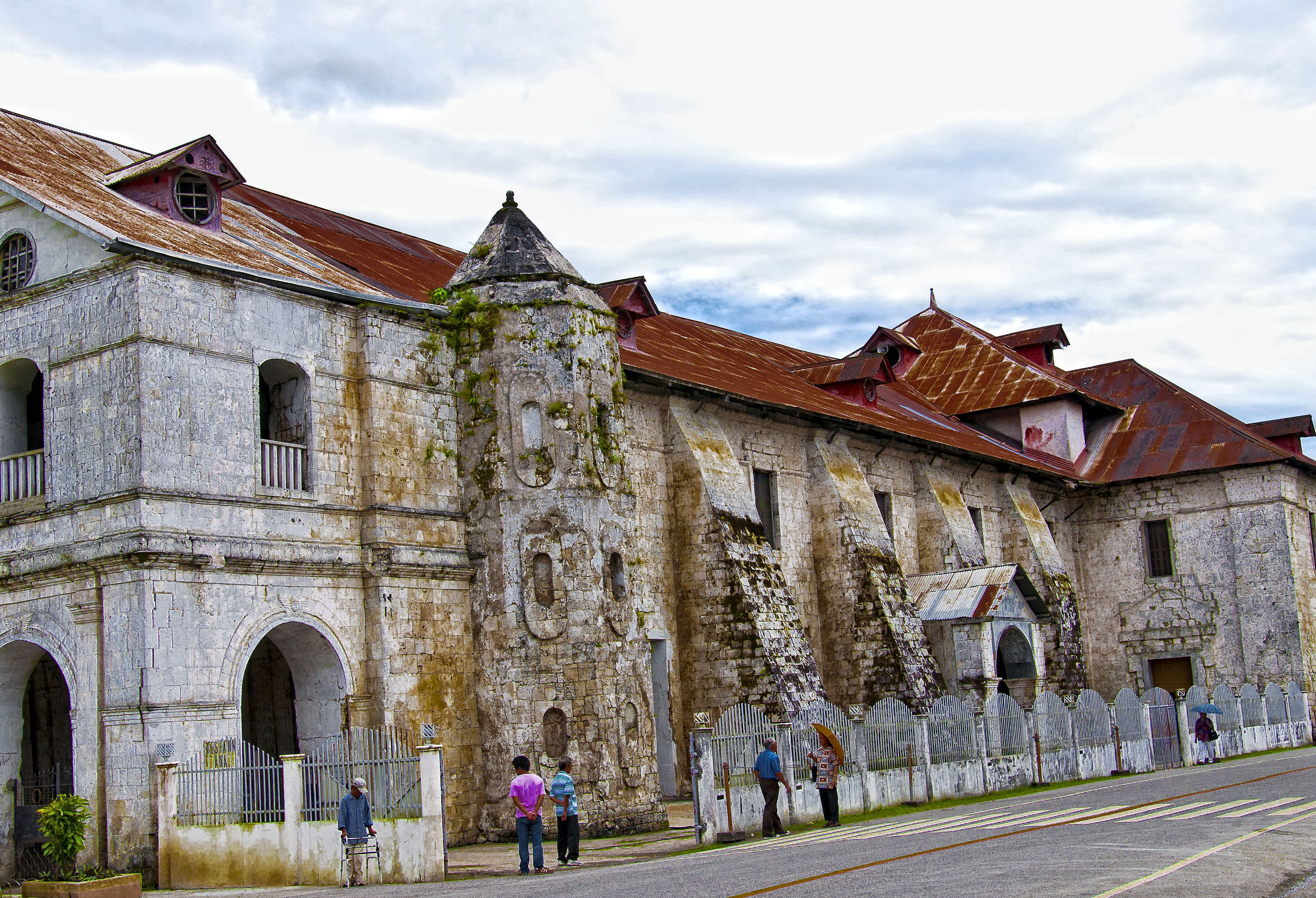
Thick walls of the church

The church is built along the banks of the Loboc River. The coral stone church follows a cruciform plan, with a sunken pyramidal roof on its crossing. As a church built by the Jesuits, exterior walls of the church have the Jesuit insignia and icons of an angel's wing and head. Major renovations were undertaken by Augustinian priest Father Aquilino Bon, including the addition of a portico to the façade (1863–1866) and re-roofing with tiles (1873). Father José Sánchez, OAR, added stone buttresses to the walls (1891–1893) and side porticoes (1895–1896). Because of frequent flooding, its wooden flooring was changed to cement tiles in 1895 and was elevated in 1969.

=== Interior ===
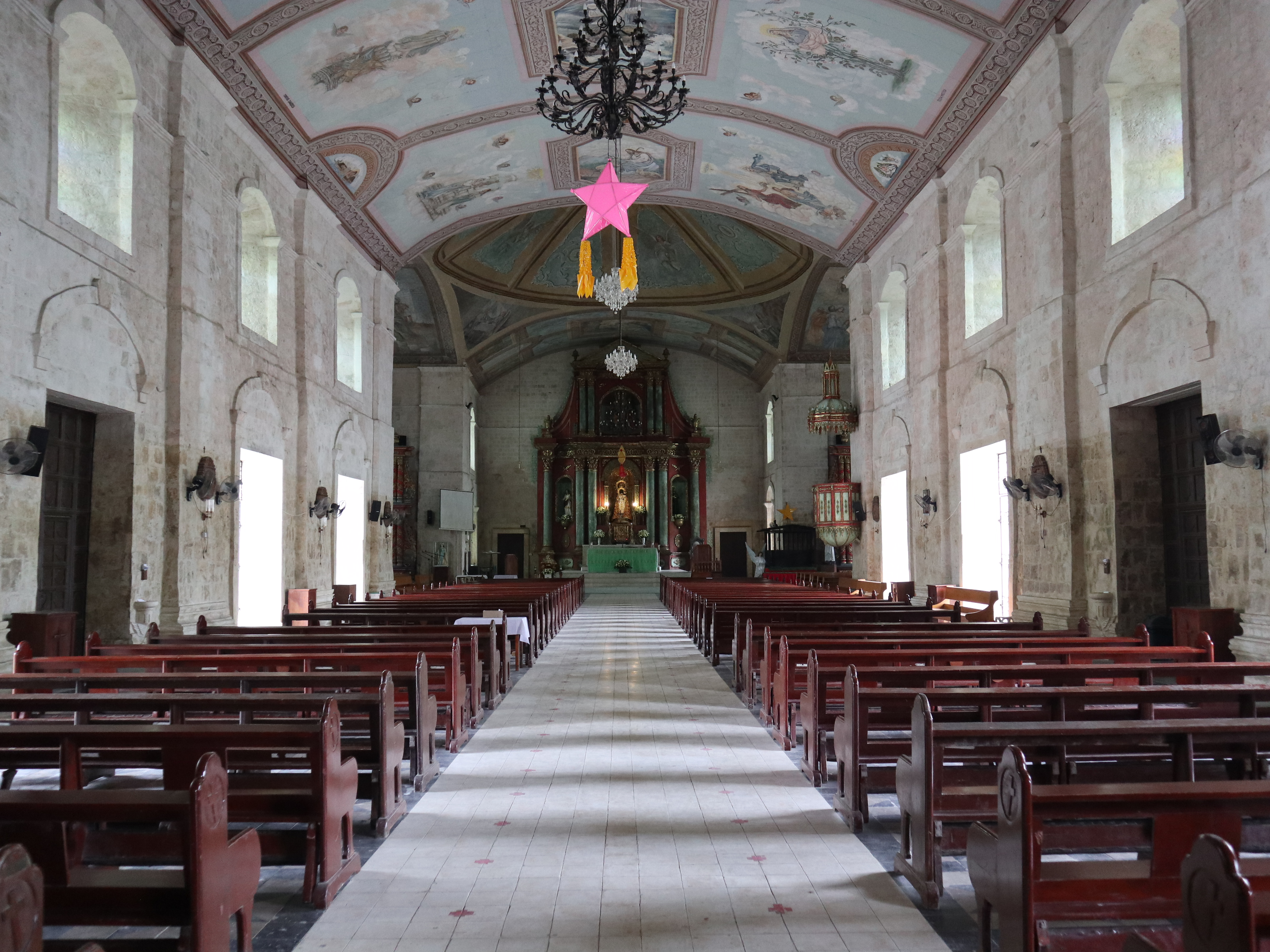
Central nave of the church in 2023

The interior of the church is adorned with ceiling paintings by Canuto Ávila and his sons, Ricardo and Ray Francia, created from May 1926 to July 1927, and retouched by Cris Naparota in 1995. A mural of Our Lady of Guadalupe, secondary patron of Loboc, painted by Max Aya-ay in 1930 at the center of the nave depicts the Virgin saving Loboc from floods. The church also has a separate cantilevered organ loft hosting a large pipe organ believed to be connected with Father Diego Cera, maker of the Las Piñas Bamboo organ.

==== Façade ====
The inner baroque façade, which is part of the 1734 church built by the Jesuits, is decorated with pilasters, capitals, blind niches and volutes. It is patterned after San Ignacio Church in Intramuros, with two levels, a triangular pediment, and two narrow octagonal bell towers on each side. The neoclassical portico houses niches for Saint Peter and Saint Paul. Along the pediment is a wooden bas-relief on galvanized iron of the papal tiara over crossed keys (the symbol of Saint Peter) on the center and medallions of the icons of the Augustinians and Saint Peter on both ends.

==== Altars ====
The church has five retablos (reredos). The central retablo (or retablo mayor) at the altar houses images of Saint Peter, the patron, paired with Saint Paul on the uppermost niche. On the lowest level are images of Our Lady of Guadalupe, the secondary patron, in the center. Also on the lowest level were statues of Saint Lucy, patron against typhoons and Saint Francis Xavier, patron against floods and alligators. Both Saint Lucy and Saint Francis were elected patrons in 1697. Behind the walls of the retablo mayor are the remains of the former Jesuit altarpiece, a bas-relief of Saint Ignatius Loyola and Saint Francis Xavier dressed as a pilgrim. Hidden by the main altar, is a bas-relief of Saint Ignatius and Saint Francis Xavier in stucco, as traces this was once a Jesuit church.

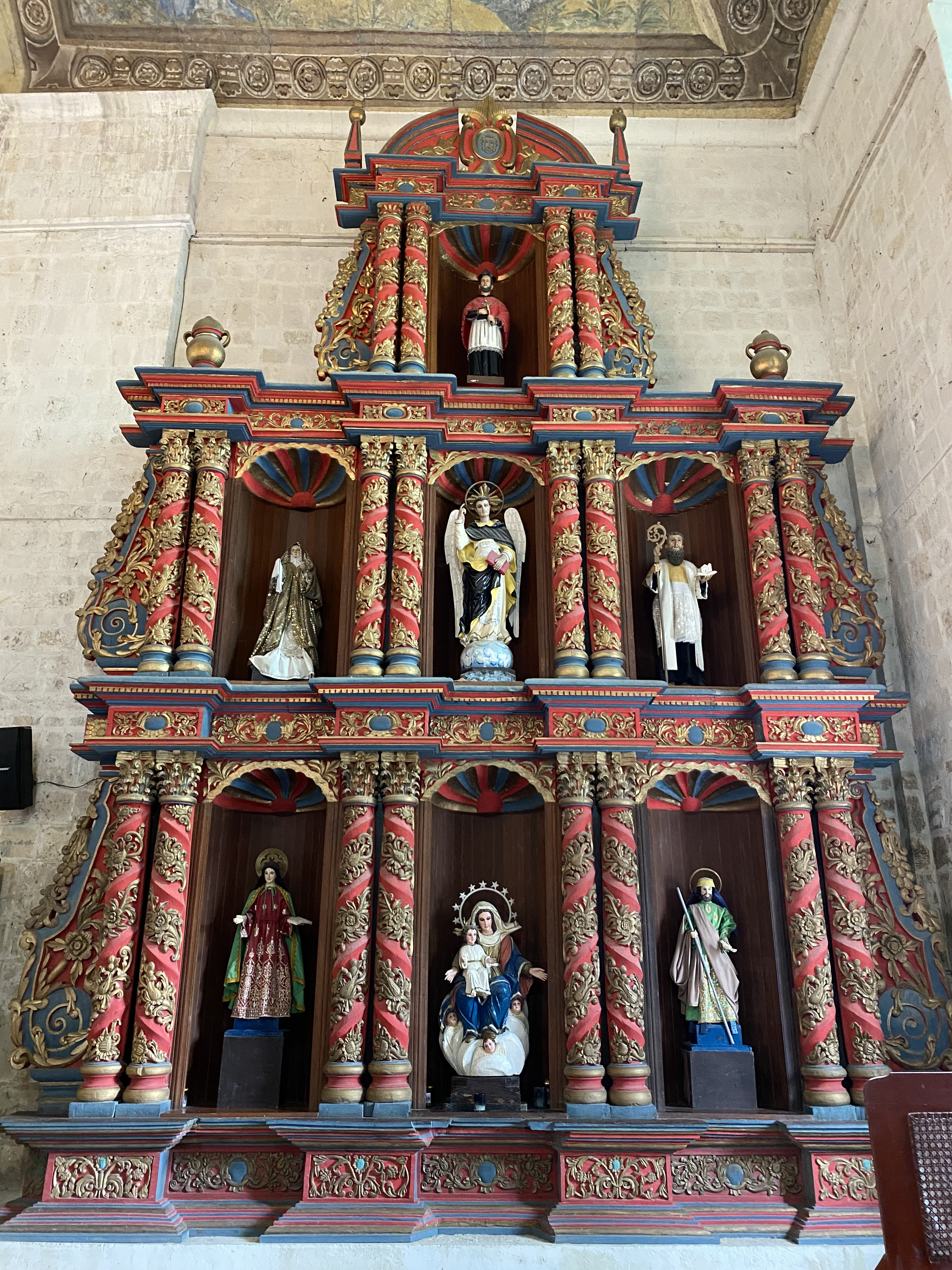
Right side altar retablo

===== Epistle retablo =====
On the right side of the altar are two retablos. The larger altar on the right side currently houses the image of Saint Francis Xavier as preacher on the topmost level. On the middle level of the same retablo are images of Saint Vincent Ferrer in the center, and Saint Augustine and Saint Monica on the left and right niches, respectively. The lowest level contains images of the Nuestra Señora de la Consolacion in the center, Saint Anne to the right and Saint Thérèse of Lisieux (originally St Joachim) on the left. The smaller altar has two levels of baroque and neoclassical style, respectively, with images of the crucified Christ on the lower level and the Holy Infant on the upper. The tomb of Father Aquilino Bon and other Recollect priests who served Loboc are also on this side of the church. The remains of Jesuit priest Alonso de Humanes were formerly interred in this area before the transfer of his remains to San Ignacio Church in Intramuros. An apocryphal account tells of a fire in a former Loboc church stopping at the foot of Humanes' tomb; this story spread across the people of the Loboc and nearby towns, which drew pilgrims to light candles in memory of Humanes.

===== Gospel retablo =====
On the left side of the altar are also two retablos. The larger altar, which is a twin of the altar opposite it, houses an image of an unidentified saint on the topmost level, presumably Michael the Archangel, and the crucified Christ (originally Madonna and Child) in the center, Saint Anthony of Padua on the middle-left, and Saint Nicholas of Tolentino on the middle-right niches. The original images on the lowest level have been replaced. The smaller retablo, also of the same style, houses the images of Saint Joseph with the Child Jesus, and Saint Isidore the Laborer on the lower and upper level, respectively. In the sacristy is another retablo, with a crucifix in its central niche. On the doorframes of the sacristy are two bas-reliefs depicting Saint Ignatius and the first Jesuits before Mary and the Child Jesus and of Saint Ignatius holding a book (in stucco).

=== Outbuildings ===
Outbuildings of Loboc Church

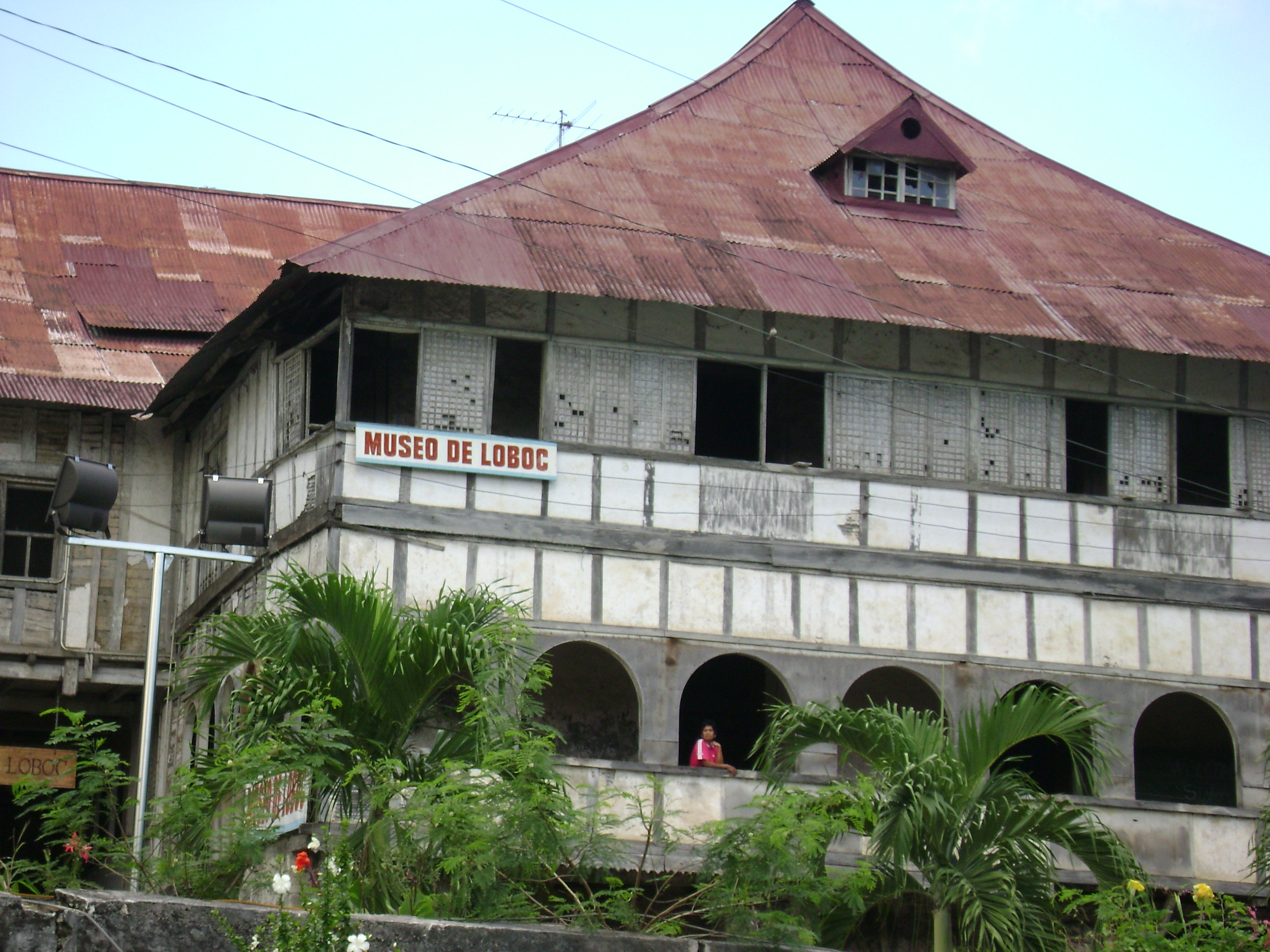
Convent

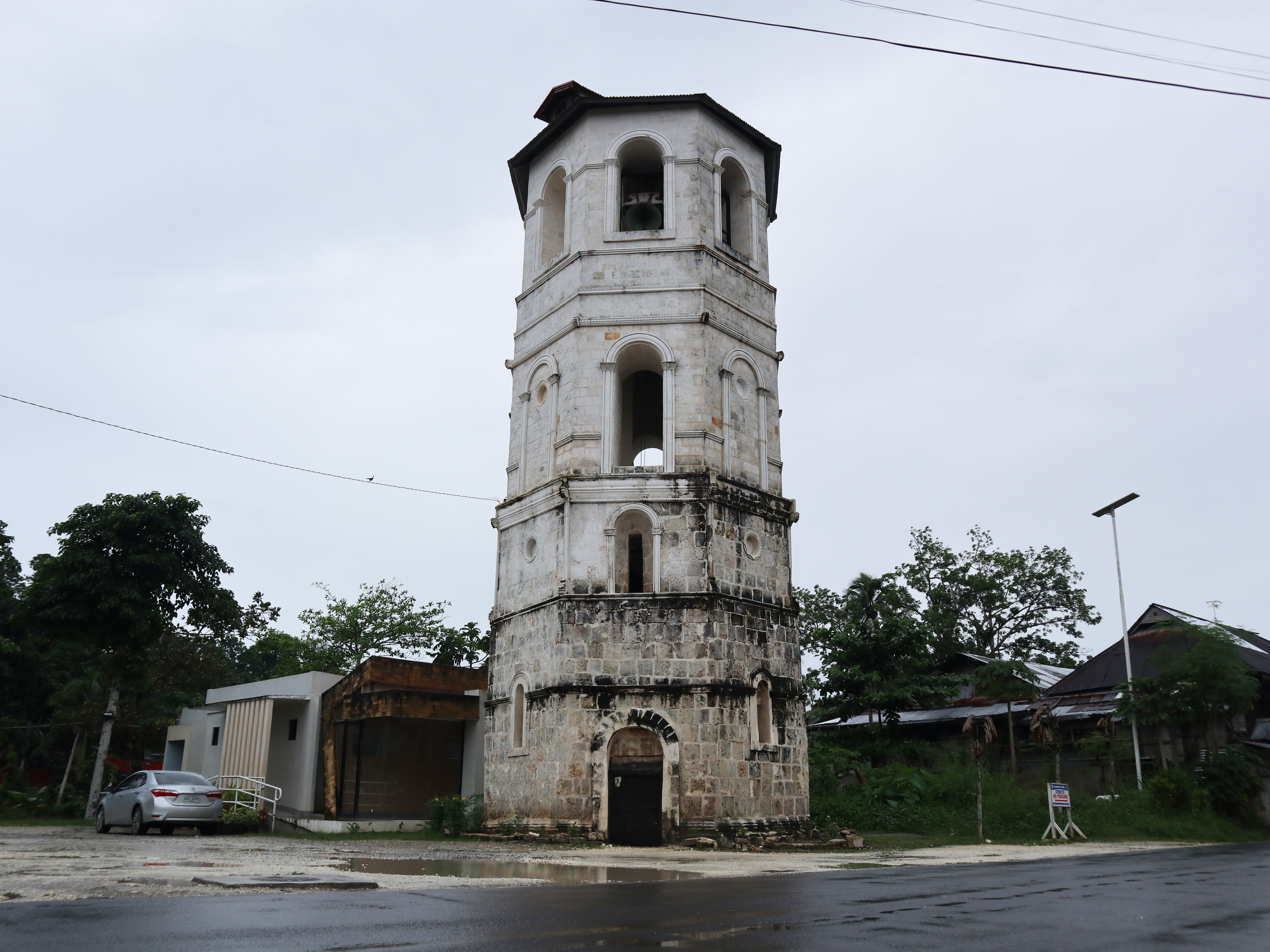
Bell tower

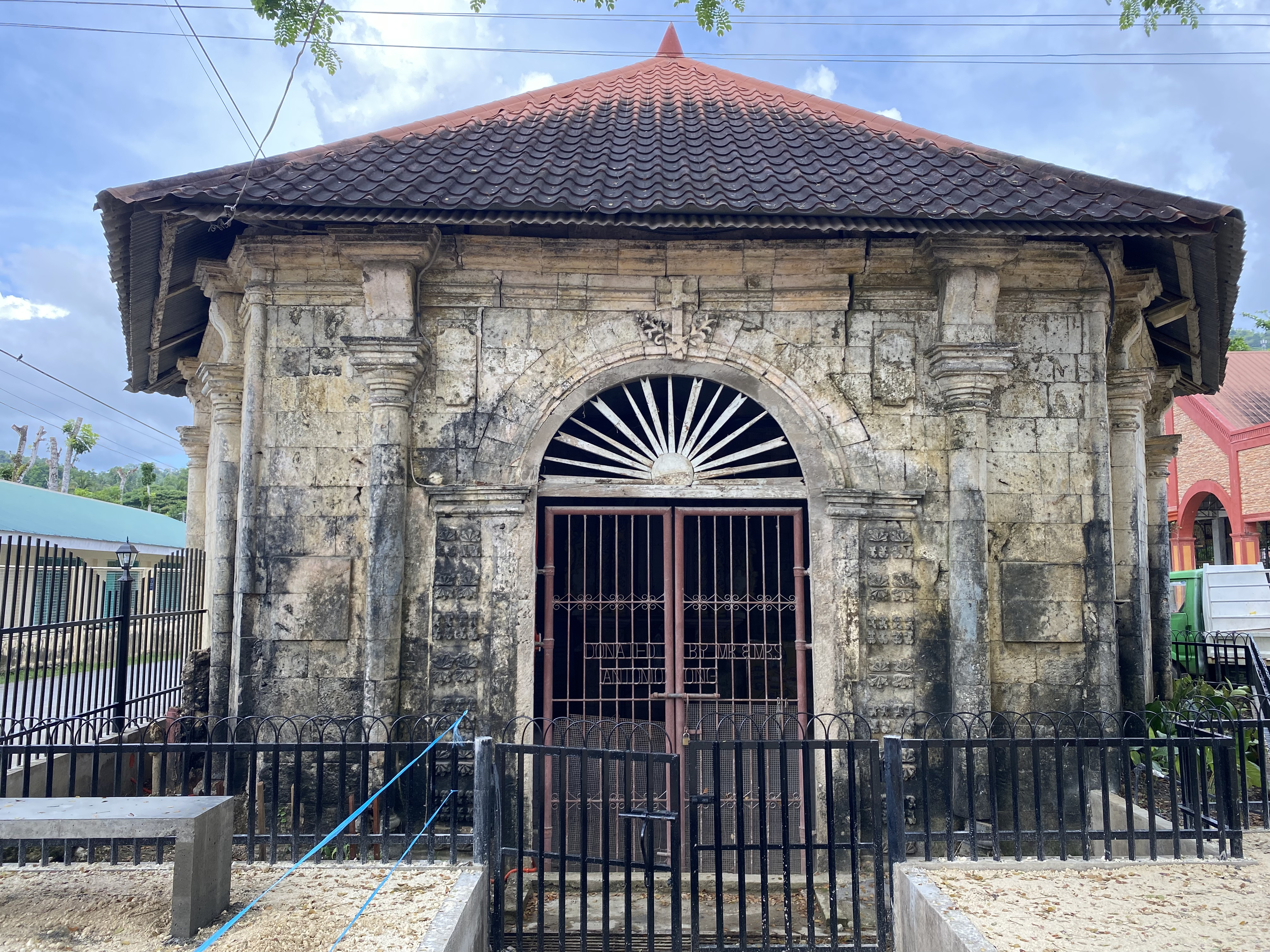
Adoration chapel (formerly mortuary chapel)

==== Sacristy and Convent ====
The convent, which was built around 1854, was used as the central residence of Jesuit missionaries in Bohol. It is built with a rare type of bahay na bato architecture. It was built parallel to the transept and was an unusual three-storey structure, with a two-storey outdoor gallery (called a volada) and thick walls. It is the only convent in the Philippines with three storeys. An extension perpendicular to the convent was built in the middle of the 19th century. The convent was also adorned with paintings on its walls and ceilings, and with colored glass on its windows and cornices on the kitchen. The roof was replaced with galvanized iron in 1888. The third floor of the convent is now used as an ecclesiastical museum (known as Loboc Museum), containing several religious artifacts, such as a 1786 silver missal and 18th century wooden Santo Niño.

==== Belltower ====
A detached four-storey bell tower was built near the riverbanks by the first Augustinian Recollect priest of Loboc. It has seven bells, with the 1863 bell being the oldest and the 1937 bell, named for Father Cayetano Bastes, being the largest. It also has a large wooden ratchet, installed in 1899, which is used during the Paschal Triduum (when bells are forbidden), and a clock made by the Altonaga Company, installed in 1893.

==== Mortuary chapel ====
A hexagonal mortuary is located on the left side of the façade. It was built by Father Bon between 1867 and 1868. Inside is a baroque retablo, similar to the altars inside the church. It is now used as an adoration chapel.

== See also ==
- Loboc Children's Choir

== Bibliography ==
- Javellana, Rene SJ (1988). "Angels and Gargoyles of Loboc Church" (pdf). Philippine Studies. 36 (1). Ateneo de Manila University: 88–97.
- Jose, Regalado Trota (2001). Visita Iglesia Bohol (A Guide to Historic Churches). Manila: National Commission for Culture and the Arts. pp. 68–75. ISBN 9718140166.
- O'Malley, John (1999). The Jesuits: Cultures, Sciences, and the Arts, 1540-1773, Volume 1. University of Toronto Press. p. 429. ISBN 9780802042873.
