= Guiuan Church =

Roman Catholic church in Eastern Samar, Philippines

- Immaculate Conception Parish Church; Parish Church of Our Lady of the Immaculate Conception
- Iglesia Parroquial de la Inmaculada Concepción (Spanish)
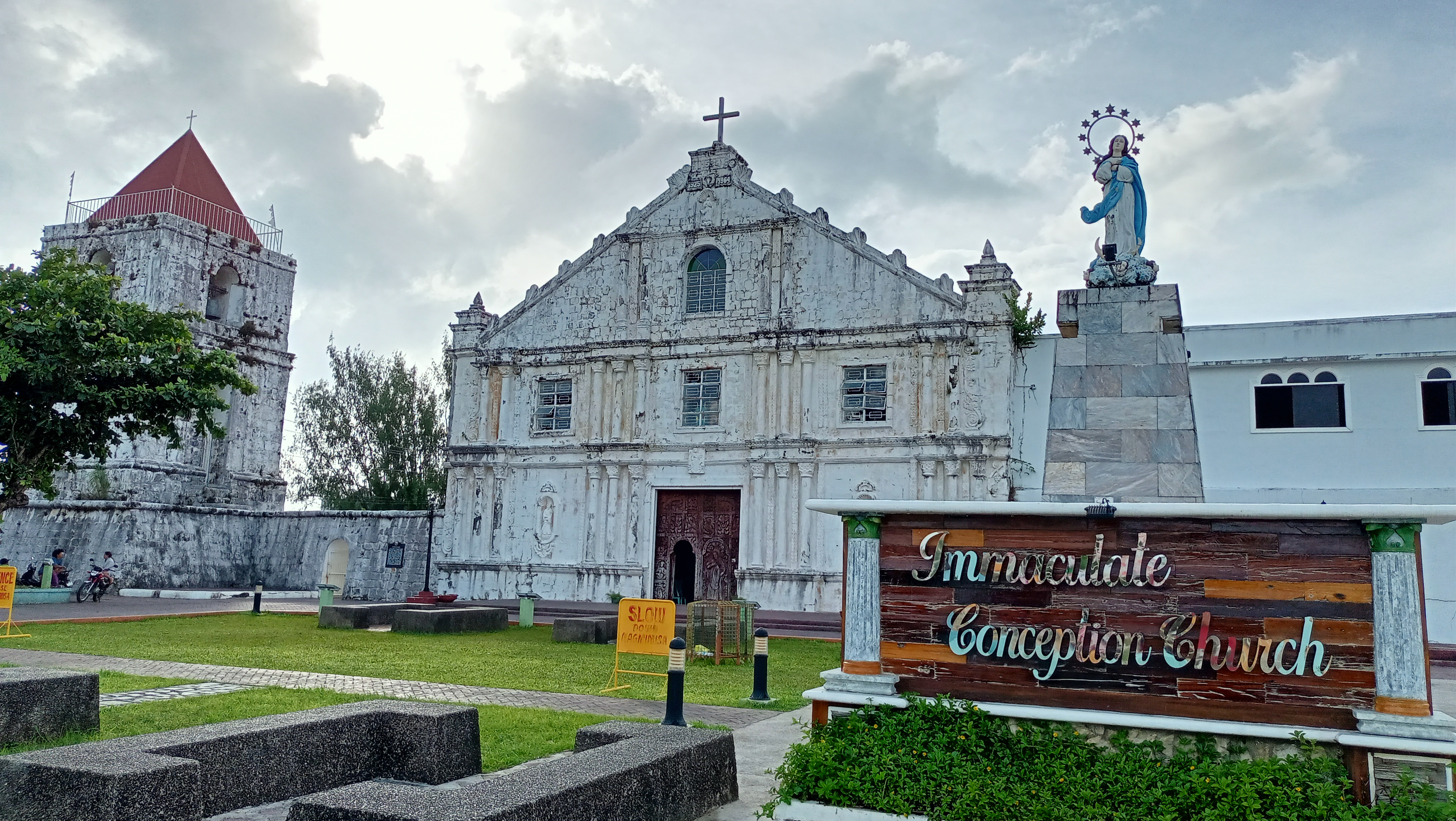
- Guiuan Church in 2022

- Location in the Visayas Location in the Philippines
- 11°01′53″N 125°43′22″E
- Location: Guiuan, Eastern Samar
- Country: Philippines
- Denomination: Roman Catholic

History
- Status: Parish church
- Founder: Jesuits
- Dedication: Immaculate Conception

Architecture
- Functional status: Active
- Heritage designation: National Cultural Treasure
- Architectural type: Church building
- Style: Baroque
- Completed: 1718; 2019 (restoration from Typhoon Haiyan)
- Demolished: 2013 (Typhoon Haiyan)

Administration
- Archdiocese: Palo
- Diocese: Borongan

Clergy
- Archbishop: John F. Du
- Bishop: Crispin Barrete Varquez

Immaculate Conception Parish Church, commonly known as Guiuan Church, is a Roman Catholic church in the municipality of Guiuan, Eastern Samar, Philippines, within the jurisdiction of the Diocese of Borongan.

The church is classified as a National Cultural Treasure by the National Museum of the Philippines. It was formerly nominated to the UNESCO World Heritage Sites of the Philippines under two categories, the Baroque Churches of the Philippines (Extension) and the Jesuit Churches of the Philippines.

The church, built in the 18th century, was significantly damaged when Typhoon Haiyan (local name: Yolanda) made landfall in Guiuan and struck other parts of Central Visayas on November 8, 2013. While the church's roof was destroyed and the façade damaged, the church's walls were largely left intact. Restoration of the damaged church was completed in 2019.

== Church history ==
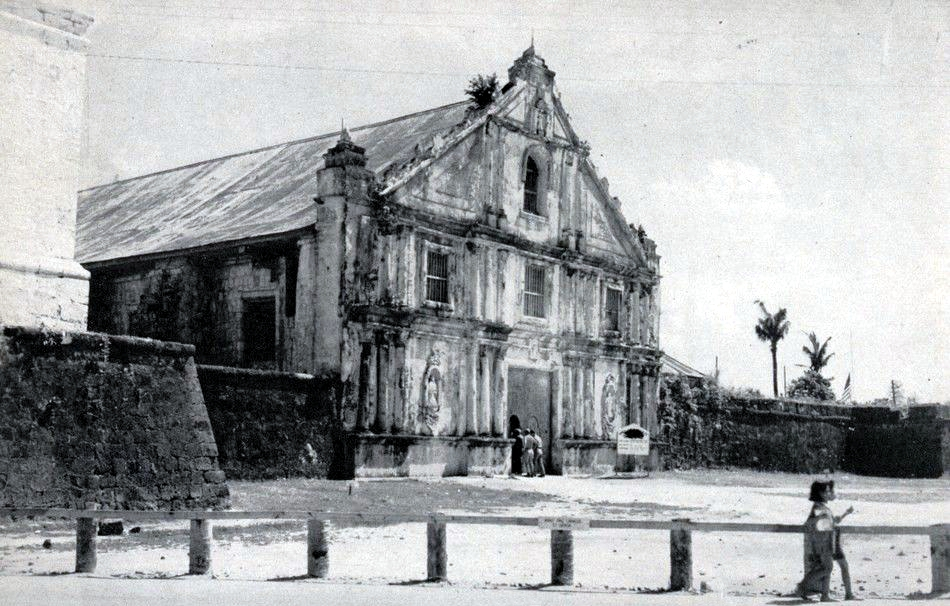
The church in 1945

Guiuan (also spelled as Guiguan) was founded by the Jesuits in 1595. It was handed over to the Augustinians upon instructions from the Spanish colonial government due to the Jesuits Suppression in 1768. It was then transferred to the Franciscans in 1795 but due to lack of priests, Father Miguel Pérez, the first Franciscan priest of Guiuan was only assigned in 1804. The original church of Guiuan was made of wood and destroyed by fire.

The present stone church was dedicated to the Virgin Mary under the title of the Immaculate Conception and was built by the early Jesuits in 1718 and was renovated by adding a transept and baptistery during the term of Father Manuel Valverde and Pedro Monasterio in 1844. A bell tower on top fort was built in 1854. Another convent was built by Father Arsenio Figueroa in 1872. The church was refurbished in 1935 and the sanctuary was renovated in 1987. On November 8, 2013, the church along with other buildings and structures in Guiuan was severely damaged due to Typhoon Haiyan, which made landfall in the town. While the roof was destroyed and the façade was damaged, the church's stone walls remain unscathed, as do the floors and the crypts.

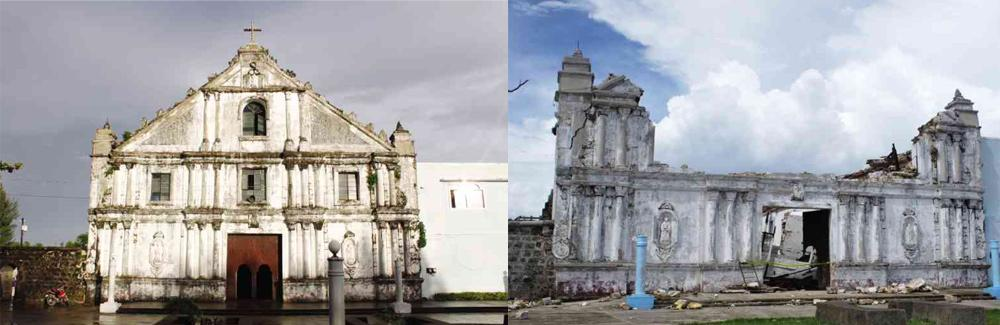
Guiuan Church before (left) and after Typhoon Haiyan

=== Historical and cultural declarations ===
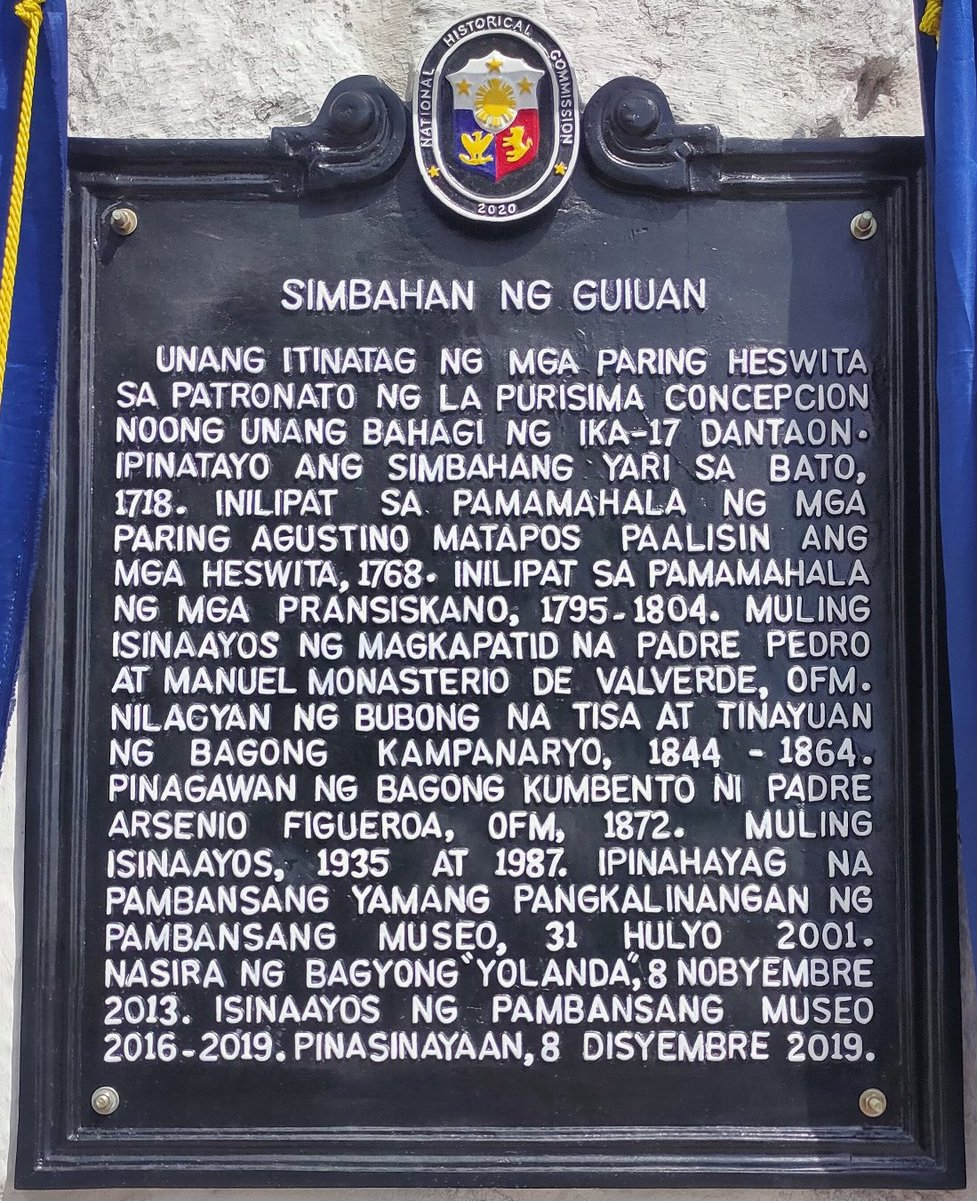
Church NHC historical marker installed in 2021

The National Museum of the Philippines named Guiuan Church a National Cultural Treasure in 2001. As a nominee for the UNESCO World Heritage Sites of the Philippines, it is grouped with Maragondon Church, Baclayon Church and Loboc Church for the Jesuit Churches of the Philippines and with Boljoon Church, Loboc Church, Tumauini Church and Lazi Church for the Baroque Churches of the Philippines (Extension) nomination. However, due to its total destruction, it was then removed from the roster of nominated sites.

On March 18, 2021, as part of the 2021 Quincentennial Commemorations in the Philippines marking the 500th anniversary of the arrival of the Magellan–Elcano circumnavigation to the Philippines, the National Historical Commission of the Philippines unveiled a historical marker commemorating the church.

=== Description ===
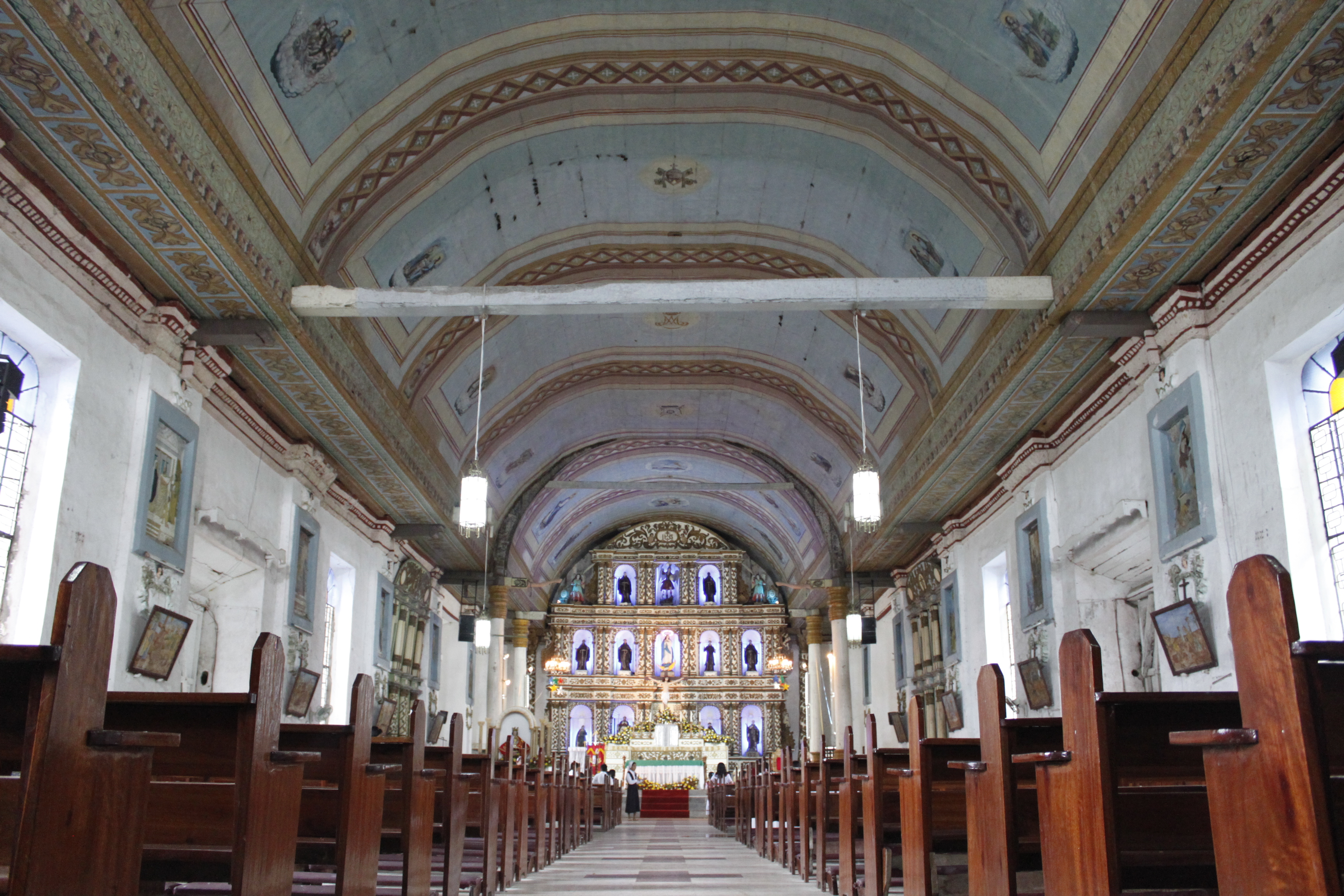
Church interior in 2012, prior to Typhoon Haiyan

Guiuan Church is nestled inside a fort. It is well known for its extensive shell ornamentation in its interiors. Studies revealed that at least eight types of seashells were used. Before its destruction, it still has two elaborately carved doors out of the original three doors. The main door on the entrance has exquisite carvings of the Twelve Apostles while a side door has carved representations of angels. Former First Lady Imelda Marcos was interested in purchasing the church's door for ₱1,000,000 using government funds siphoned by her husband, Ferdinand Marcos.

== Present condition ==
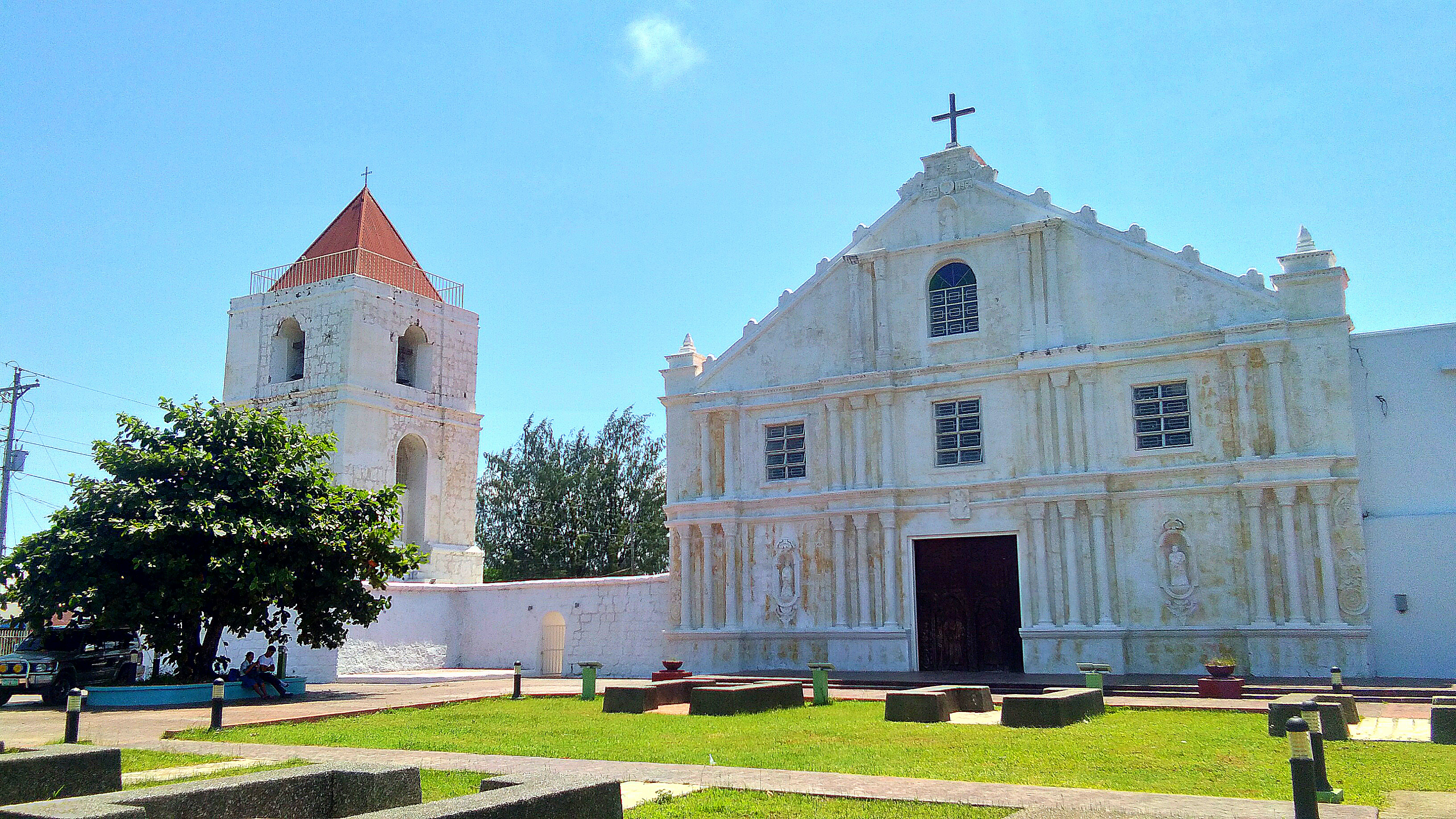
The newly restored Guiuan Church in 2019

Due to Typhoon Haiyan, all of its original retablo, roof (dated 1700s) and other church relics were damaged. Only the stone walls and bell tower remained standing. Restoration of the church was under the supervision of the National Museum of the Philippines. Funds for the reconstruction of the church amounting to $300,000 were given by the Embassy of the United States in the Philippines and ₱112 million from the National Museum of the Philippines. Restoration of the church was completed in 2019.

== See also ==
- Donato Guimbaolibot
- List of Jesuit sites

== Bibliography ==
- Huerta, Felix de (1865). Estado geográfico, topográfico, estadístico, histórico-religioso [Geographical, topographical, statistical, historical and religious state] (in Spanish). Binondo: Imprenta de M. Sanchez y Ca.
