= List of National Cultural Treasures in the Philippines =

Current logo for the Philippine Registry of Cultural Property

Declarations of National Cultural Treasures (NCTs; Mga Pambansang Yamang Pangkalinangan in Filipino) are regulated by the National Cultural Heritage Act. Designations are undertaken by the National Commission for Culture and the Arts and related agencies such as the National Museum, the National Library, and the National Archives. Nominations for an item to be designated with an NCT title may be submitted by any Filipino institution or person.

== Classification ==
RA 10066 outlines the processes in selection, declaration, preservation, promotion and delisting of cultural property as National Cultural Treasure (NCT).

NCTs are classified two property categories, tangible and intangible, meanwhile tangible cultural property can be categorized into immovable and movable national cultural treasures:

- Tangible cultural property – cultural property with historical, archival, anthropological, archaeological, artistic and architectural value, and with exceptional or traditional production, whether of Philippine origin or not, including antiques and natural history specimens with significant value
  - Movable National Cultural treasures – movable objects with historical, anthropological, archaeological value and/ or associated with national history
  - Immovable National Cultural treasures – structures that shall not be relocated, rebuilt, defaced or otherwise changed in a manner, which would destroy the property's dignity and authenticity, except to save such property from destruction due to natural causes
- Intangible cultural property – peoples' learned processes along with the knowledge, skills and creativity that inform and are developed by them, the products they create and the resources, spaces and other aspects of social and natural context necessary for their sustainability

Furthermore, article II, section 3 of the law also includes the category Natural property of cultural significance refers to areas possessing outstanding ecosystem with flora and fauna of national scientific importance. This categorization is used in National Integrated Protected Areas System as well as other government databases, such as the Philippine Registry of cultural property.

== Privileges ==
Cultural properties deemed National Cultural Treasure (NCT) shall have the following:

1. Priority government funding for protection, conservation and restoration
2. Incentive for private support of conservation and restoration
3. An official heritage marker identifying the cultural property as national cultural treasures
4. Governmental protection from armed conflict, national disasters and other exceptional events

== Natural National Cultural Treasures ==
Official NCT Name	Current location	Period	Description	Legal Basis	Year declared
Petroglyphs of Alab	Bontoc, Mountain Province	Bronze age ca. 1500 BC	The Alab petroglyphs are ancient figures interpreted to as human genitalia carved on rock by the prehistoric people of Bontoc, Mountain Province.	PD 260, s. 1973	1973
1 2 Mummy Caves of Kabayan, Benguet and of Sagada and Alab, Bontoc	1. Kabayan, Benguet; 2. Sagada, Mountain Province; 3. Alab, Bontoc, Mountain Province	14th–19th century	Two hundred man-made burial caves, 15 of which contain preserved human mummies of the Ibaloi culture known as the Kabayan Mummies	PD 260, s. 1973	1973
Burial caves of Sitio Alabok	Bagulin, La Union		More commonly known as the Kedlap Burial cave. Once a burial site containing wooden coffins of carabao zoomorphic designs	Proclamation no. 1683, s. 1977	1977
Rizal Archaeological Reservation	Rizal, Kalinga	Neolithic to Protohistoric	Excavation site of prehistoric megafauna such as the rhinoceros and stegodon. (Note: Included in the UNESCO tentative list entitled Prehistoric Sites of the Cagayan Valley Basin.)		1977 (Note: Declared as archaeological reserve by virtue of PD no. 1109, s. 1977)
Tabon Caves Complex and all of Lipuun	Lipuun Point, Quezon, Palawan	ca. 9,000 BP	The cave complex has an approximate area of 138 hectares, composed of 218 caves, 38 of which were used as habitation and burial sites in the past. Tabon Cave, one of the caves in the complex, yielded the earliest human remains found in the Philippines.	NMP Declaration No. 1-2011	2011
Dewil Valley	Palawan	Neolithic to Protohistoric	Limestone Karst forest with evidences of Neolithic to Protohistoric human habitation such as shell middens and burial sites.	NMP Declaration No. 39-2020	2020

Tentative UNESCO World Heritage Site

== Tangible-movable National Cultural Treasures ==
Official NCT Name	Current location	Period	Description	Legal Basis/Official marker	Year declared
Assassination of Governor Bustamante and His Son by Félix Resurrección Hidalgo y Padilla	National Museum of Fine Arts, Ermita, Manila	1884	An oil-on-canvas painting depicting the assassination of Spanish governor-general Fernando Manuel de Bustillo Bustamante y Rueda in 1719. The painting won Hidalgo a silver medal in the 1884 Exposición Nacional de Bellas Artes in Madrid, Spain.	E.A.D. Gobernador Bustamante Historical Marker, Manila	1974
Balangays	National Museum – Butuan, Libertad, Butuan	320 A.D.	Balangays are large plank boats which were the main form of transportation in the precolonial era. These ancient balangays were found in what used to be the Kingdom of Butuan.	Proclamation 86, s. 1987	1987
History of Manila by Carlos V. Francisco	National Museum of Fine Arts, Ermita, Manila	1968	Also known as the Filipino struggles through history, this monumental painting depicting the History of Manila is painted by NA Carlos V. Francisco.	Kasaysayan ng Maynila ICP Marker	1996
Basi Revolt Paintings by Esteban Pichay Villanueva	National Museum – Vigan, Ilocos Sur	1807	The paintings depict the Basi Revolt, also known as the Ambaristo Revolt in 1807 which was held in opposition to taxes on liquor in the Ilocos against the Spanish. The series of 14 paintings by Esteban Pichay Villanueva currently hangs at the National Museum in Vigan.		2009
Plan of a first class public school in Mati, Mindanao Spanish document section of the National Archives of the Philippines	National Library of the Philippines, Ermita, Manila		Eighteen million original pages of documentation from the Spanish colonial period dating as far as the 16th century		
Feeding the Chicken Painting by Simon Flores	National Museum of Fine Arts, Ermita, Manila	1890	An oil-on-canvas painting of master painter Simon Flores regarded as a transition from the miniaturist school of homegrown portraitists of the nineteenth century to the idyllic tableaux of the American period academic masters.	NMP Declaration No. 03-2008	2008
Una Bulaqueña Una Bulaqueña Painting by Juan Luna	National Museum of Fine Arts, Ermita, Manila On loan: Louvre Abu Dhabi	1895	Also known as La Bulaqueña, literally "the woman from Bulacan", the oil-on-canvas painting is portrait of a Emiliana Yriarte Trinidad, Filipino woman wearing a traditional Filipino dress. Painted by Juan Luna.	Una Bulaqueña ICP Marker, Manila Museum Declaration No. 01-2008	2008
Mother's Revenge	National Museum of Fine Arts, Ermita, Manila	1894	Made by revolutionary hero Jose Rizal during his exile in Dapitan. The terra cotta sculpture is an allegorical representation of the situation in the Philippines during the Spanish colonial period.	NMP Declaration No. 02-2008	2008
1 2 13 16 18 21 22 23 25 Artifacts and Ecofacts from Philippine Archaeological Sites	National Museum of Anthropology, Ermita, Manila	Pleistocene (707,000 YA) – 15th century	National Cultural Treasures are as follows: 1. Manunggul Burial Jar; 2. Calatagan Ritual Pot; 3. Maitum Anthropomorphic Burial Jar No. 13; 4. Maitum Quadrangular Burial Jar; 5. Leta-Leta Jarlet with Yawning Mouth; 6. Leta-Leta Footed Jarlet; 7. Leta-Leta Presentation Dish; 8. Pandanan 14th Century Blue-and-White Porcelain; 9. Lena Shoal Blue-and-White Dish with Flying Elephant; 10. Puerto Galera Blue-and-White Jar; 11. Palawan Zoomorphic Ear Pendant; 12. Cabalwan Earliest Flake Tools; 13. Batangas Likha Figurines; 14. Mataas Shell Scoop; 15. Duyong Shell Adze; 16. Tabon Skull Cap; 17. Tabon Mandible; 18. Tabon Tibia Fragment; 19. Bolinao Skull with Teeth Ornamentation; 20. Gold Seal of Captain General Antonio Morga; 21. Oton Death Mask; 22. Butuan Paleograph; 23. Laguna Copper Plate; 24. San Diego Astrolabe; 25. Banton Burial Cloth; 26. Marinduque Celadon Jar; 27. Butuan Balangay Boat; 28. Butuan Crucible	Palayok ng Kalatagan Marker, NMA, Manila 2 Marker of Telang Pangyumao ng Banton at National Museum of Anthropology in Manila, Philippines 25 NMP Declaration No. 3-2010	2010
Spoliarium Spoliarium by Juan Luna	National Museum of Fine Arts, Ermita, Manila	1884	An oil-on-canvas painting by Juan Luna considered by the Filipino art community as the most prized painting made by a Filipino master painter.		2006
top bottom Retablo (altar piece) from the Church of San Nicolas de Tolentino in Dimiao, Bohol	National Museum of Fine Arts, Ermita, Manila	18th century	A side altar from the St. Nicholas de Tolentine Parish in Dimiao, Bohol. The retablo with traces of vibrant polychrome was made by an unknown master.	From the Dimiao catholic church in Bohol, Philippines NMP Declaration No. 6-2011	2011
The Progress of Medicine in the Philippines by Carlos V. Francisco	National Museum of Fine Arts, Ermita, Manila	1953	The artwork consists of four oil paintings on canvas created by national artist Carlos V. Francisco in 1953 for the entrance of the Philippine General Hospital. This quadriptych depicts the history of medicine in the Philippines until the middle of the 20th century.		2011
Parisian Life by Juan Luna	National Museum of Fine Arts, Ermita, Manila	1892	Interior d'un Café (Parisian Life) by Juan Luna (1857–1899) was exhibited in 1904 at the St Louis Exposition (World's Fair).		
University of Santo Tomas Baybayin Documents	University of Santo Tomas, Sampaloc, Manila	1613	The UST Baybayin Documents are 17th century land deeds written in baybayin, an ancient Philippine syllabary or suyat. It is the first document to be declared a National Cultural Treasure.		2014
International Rice Research Institute Series by Vicente Manansala	National Museum of Fine Arts, Ermita, Manila	1962	Twin murals of NA Vicente Manansala portraying Filipino rural life, previously displayed at the International Rice Research Institute in Los Baños, Laguna.		2015
Maradika Qur'an of Bayang (From Lanao del Sur)	National Museum of Anthropology, Ermita, Manila		The oldest known Quran (Koran) in the Philippines. The Quran is believed to be one of the few copies translated into a non-Arabic language—that is, using a language in the Malay family and handwritten in Arabic calligraphy.		2015
Alcaiceria de San Fernando Marker of 1762 (from Binondo)	National Museum of Anthropology, Ermita, Manila	1762	A large stone tablet discovered at the Spanish colonial era site of the Real Alcaicería de San Fernando – a customhouse and marketplace, an example of official regulations enacted by the Spanish colonial government against the Chinese.		2015
1 2 3 4 Sacred Art of the Parish Church of Santiago Apostol (Four Paintings in Situ)	Paete, Laguna	18th–19th century	Four monumental paintings inside the St. James the Apostle Parish church in Paete, Laguna, which are: 1. San Cristobal I 2. San Cristobal II; 3. Langit, Lupa at Impierno; 4. Jucio Final	Declaration No. 11-2015/13-2015	2015
Sacred Painting of the Image of Nuestra Señora de la Soledad de Porta Vaga, Including the Intangible Properties Intrinsic to the Cultural Significance of the Painting (Note: This cultural object is both tangible-movable and intangible.)	Diocesan Shrine of Our Lady of Solitude of Porta Vaga, Cavite City, Cavite	1692	A shrine containing a framed image of the Virgin that was found on the beach along Cañacao Bay by fishermen and local residents working at the Cavite Royal Arsenal	National Cultural Treasure Pin of Our Lady of Solitude of Porta Vaga NMP declaration no. 2, s. 2017	2017
Nueva Segovia Archdiocesan Archives	Vigan, Ilocos Sur	early 1990s	Archives of the Archdiocese of Nueva Segovia which contains documents as early as 1645. Notable documents are the death register of Gabriela Silang – a national hero of the Philippines and the baptismal records of Father Jose Burgos, a Filipino martyr		2018
National cultural treasure marker Pambansang Yamang Pangkalinangan Ang Kiukok, Men at work triptych Men at Work by Ang Kiukok	National Museum of Fine Arts, Ermita, Manila	1979	A semi-abstract triptych of men at work by NA Ang Kiukok commissioned for the National Manpower and Youth Commission which was displayed at the TESDA-NCR office.	National cultural treasure marker Pambansang Yamang Pangkalinangan Ang Kiukok, Men at work triptych	2021
Culion Museum and Archives	Culion, Palawan	2016	Culion Museum and Archives (2016) of the Culion Leper colony, established in 1906 which once the largest leper colony in the world. (Note: Inscribed in the UNESCO Memory of the world Asia-Pacific Register in 2018.)		2024
Noli Me Tangere	National Library of the Philippines, Ermita, Manila		Original manuscript of the first novel of Jose Rizal – Filipino polymath and Nationalist housed at the National Library of the Philippines		2024
First page of El filibusterismo manuscript El Filibusterismo	National Library of the Philippines, Ermita, Manila		Original manuscript of the second novel of Jose Rizal – Filipino polymath and Nationalist housed at the National Library of the Philippines		2024
Mi Ultimo Adios	National Library of the Philippines, Ermita, Manila		Original manuscript of the last poem of Jose Rizal – Filipino polymath and Nationalist housed at the National Library of the Philippines		2024
Baptism of Christ By Juan Senson of the Saint Clement Parish Collection in Angono, Rizal	Angono, Rizal	19th to early 20th century	Ibero-American style painting of the Baptism of Christ on galvanized tin sheet by Juan "Tandang Juancho" Seson.		2024
Carta Hydrographica y Chronologica de las Islas Filipinas "1734 Murillo Velarde Map"	National Library of the Philippines, Ermita, Manila	1734	Dubbed the "Mother of Philippine Maps", this is the first and most important early scientific map made by the cartographer Pedro Murillo Velarde, engraver Nicolás de la Cruz Bagay, and the artist Francisco Suárez in 1734.		2025
Acta de la Proclamacion de Independencia del pueblo Filipino	National Library of the Philippines, Ermita, Manila	1898	Historic 23-page document of the proclamation of the Republic of the Philippines of 1898 written by Ambrosio Rianzares Bautista and proclaimed by Gen. Emilio Aguinaldo		2025

Work of a National Artist of the Philippines
Work of a National Hero of the Philippines

== Tangible-immovable National Cultural Treasures ==
Official NCT Name	Current location	Period	Description	Legal Basis/Official marker	Year declared
Santa Ana Site Museum	Santa Ana, Manila	1725	Contains artifacts collected from the archaeological excavations of the churchyard which was the 11th- to 14th-century AD settlement of the Kingdom of Namayan	PD 260, s. 1973	1973
Paoay Church Paoay Church	Paoay, Ilocos Norte	1710	The church, built by the Augustinians, is an outstanding example of Earthquake Baroque, with its large buttresses and superior craftsmanship. Part of four churches under the UNESCO world heritage site distinction under Baroque churches of the Philippines	PD 260, s. 1973	1973
Parish Church of Saint Andrew	Bacarra, Ilocos Norte	1782	An Augustinian established Spanish colonial-era church built of brick and coral stone. The sites' main feature is the dome-less belfry.	PD 260, s. 1973	1973
Church of San Agustin and Liturgical objects	Intramuros, Manila	1607	The oldest existing Roman Catholic church in the Philippines under the auspices of The Order of St. Augustine. Part of four churches under the UNESCO world heritage site distinction under Baroque Churches of the Philippines	PD 260, s. 1973	1973
Fort Pilar	Zamboanga City	1635	Formally known as Real Fuerza de Nuestra Señora del Pilar de Zaragoza, the 17th-century military defense fortress built by the Spanish colonial government was used as the main line of defense in the Zamboanga region against Muslim pirates. It became Roman Catholic Marian shrine after apparitions were seen in 1734 and 1897 and also hosts the National Museum's Zamboanga branch.	PD 260, s. 1973	1973
Angono Petroglyphs Angono Petroglyphs	Binangonan, Rizal	2000 BC	A series of 127 prehistoric figures carved on rock	PD 260, s. 1973	(Note: Declaration official name "Angono-Binangonan Petroglyphs")1973
Stone Agricultural Calendars of Dap-ay Guiday	Dap-ay, Guiday, Besao, Mountain Province		A stone calendar used by the Agawa people of Mountain Province.	PD 260, s. 1973	1973
Foggy Ifugao Rice Terraces Ifugao Rice Terraces	Banaue, Ifugao		Series of rice terraces in the Cordillera highlands of the Philippines (Note: In 1995, the site was inscribed as a UNESCO World Heritage Site entitled Rice Terraces of the Philippine Cordilleras, which include Nagacadan terrace cluster, Hungduan terrace cluster, Mayoyao terrace cluster, Bangaan terrace cluster and the Batad terrace cluster. Furthermore, other terraces are in the UNESCO tentative list under the name Rice Terraces of the Philippine Cordilleras (extension) which include Ahin Rice Terraces, Hingyon Rice Terraces Cluster, Central Banaue Rice Terraces Cluster (Pula, Cambulo, Poitan, Tam-an, Amganad, Kinakin, Gohang, San Fernando, Uhaj, Bocos, and Viewpoint) and Ducligan Rice Terraces)	PD 260, s. 1973	1973
2 3 1 Mestizo Section, The Houses of Padre Jose Burgos and Leona Florentino in its Scope	Vigan, Ilocos Sur		1. Excellent surviving example of Spanish settlement planning in the Philippines. (Note: Inscribed as UNESCO world heritage site under the name Historic city of Vigan.); 2. The Padre Jose Burgos house is the birthplace of Fr. José Burgos, one of the three Filipino martyrs known as Gomburza.; 3. The Leona Florentino House is the expansive bahay na bato of Leona Florentino, Filipina poet and satirist in the Ilocano and Spanish Languages.	PD 756, s. 1978	1978
Tau't Batu Petroglyphs	Quezon, Palawan		Anthropomorphic charcoal cave drawings in Ugpay cave	PD 1499, s. 1978	1978
Parish Church of San Agustin (Note: Part of the 26 Spanish colonial-era churches recognized as NCT in 2001)	Bacong, Negros Oriental	1850	Best preserved Spanish colonial-era church in Negros Oriental.	Bacong Church National Cultural Treasure plaque – 2 NMP Declaration 2-2001	2001
Parish Church of the Immaculate Conception	Balayan, Batangas	1795	A well-preserved Spanish colonial-era church established by the Augustinian recollects.	NMP Declaration 2-2001	2001
Parish Church of Santiago Apostol	Betis, Guagua, Pampanga	1770	Famous for the moniker "Sistine Chapel of the Philippines" for its intricate and well preserved ceiling paintings.	Betis Church National Museum Marker, Guagua, Pampanga NMP Declaration 2-2001	2001
Church complex of Patrocinio de Maria – Boljoon Church Historical Landmark 2 3 4 5 6	1. Boljoon, Cebu; 2. Carcar; 3. Sibonga; 4. Argao; 5. Dalaguete; 6. Oslob	1. 1783	The (1) Patrocinio de Maria, more commonly known as Boljoon church is a church-convent complex built in the Spanish colonial era, known for its exquisite punch woodwork. In 2018, as an expansion of the declaration of NCT, the following sites were included.: 2. Sta. Catalina de Alejandria Church; 3. Nuestra Senora del Pilar; 4. San Miguel Archangel; 5. San Guillermo de Aquitania; 6. La Inmaculada Concepcion	(1)NMP Declaration 2-2001	(1) 2001 (2–6) 2018
Saints Peter and Paul Parish Church Calasiao (Mamaradlo, Calasiao, Pangasinan; 02-24-2023) Parish Church of Saints Peter and Paul	Calasiao, Pangasinan	1852	A Spanish colonial-era church established by the Dominicans. Best-preserved church complex in Pangasinan.	NMP Declaration 2-2001	2001
1 San Vicente Ferrer Church Complex and Dampol Bridge of Dupax Del Sur	Dupax del Sur, Nueva Vizcaya	(1) 1776(2) 1818	The (1) San Vicente Ferrer Church Complex is an 18th-century Baroque church known as the best preserved Spanish colonial-era church in the province of Nueva Vizcaya. The (2) Dampol Bridge is a single-span brick and rock bridge built by the Isinai and other indigenous communities during the Spanish colonial era. The bridge having been integral to the San Vicente church complex has been added to its declaration in 2015	NMP Declaration 2-2001	(1) 2001 (2) 2015
Parish Church of Immaculate Conception of Guiuan	Guiuan, Eastern Samar	1844	A Spanish colonial-era church established by the Jesuits and further ornamented by the Franciscans. Noted for its extensive shell ornamentation in its interiors.	NMP Declaration 2-2001	2001
Parish Church of the Immaculate Conception	Jasaan, Misamis Oriental	19th century	A Spanish colonial-era church done in "barn-style" baroque noted for the facade's three stories of brick and wood.	NMP Declaration 2-2001	2001
Parish Church of San Juan Bautista	Jimenez, Misamis Occidental	1880	Also known as Jimenez Church, the structure is a late-19th century, Baroque church.	NMP Declaration 2-2001	2001
Church Complex of San Isidro Labrador	Lazi, Siquijor	1884	The Lazi Church is a well preserved Spanish colonial-era church made of coral stone and wood. Noted for its intact and expansive convent	NMP Declaration 2-2001	2001
Parish Church of San Pedro and San Pablo of Loboc	Loboc, Bohol	1734	A Jesuit established Baroque church made of coral stone famed for its ceiling murals done by Canuto Avila and sons.	MD-2-2001	2001
Parish Church of Santa Catalina de Alejandria	Luna, La Union	1741	More commonly known as the Namacpacan church, it is an example of a Spanish colonial-era earthquake baroque architecture. It is the home of the Our Lady of Namacpacan.	NMP Declaration 2-2001	2001
Mahatao Church Full Parish Church of San Carlos Borromeo	Mahatao, Batanes	1873	Also known as Mahatao Church, the first church was constructed in 1787. By 1789, the wooden church was replaced by a stone church. When a typhoon hit the Batanes islands in 1872, the church was damaged and was replaced with a more sophisticated rock church in 1873, which continues to be the current church of Mahatao.	NMP Declaration 2-2001	2001
St. William the Hermit Church in Magsingal, Ilocos Sur Parish Church of San Guillermo de Aquitania	Magsingal, Ilocos Sur	1827	A Spanish colonial era brick church noted for its unique and intricate retablo.	NMP Declaration 2-2001	2001
Majayjay Church, Laguna, Jul 2024 Parish Church of San Gregorio Magno	Majayjay, Laguna	1649	A Spanish colonial-era Romanesque brick church. Its convento is an early well-preserved example.	NMP Declaration 2-2001	2001
Maragondon Church Facade Parish Church of the Assumption of Our Lady	Maragondon, Cavite	1714	A Spanish colonial-era church famed for its intricately carved woodwork and its polychromed retablos.	NMP Declaration 2-2001	2001
San Andres Parish Church, Masinloc, Zambales Parish Church of San Andres de Masinloc	Masinloc, Zambales	18th Century	A 19th-century Baroque church built with coral stone instead of adobe stone	NMP Declaration 2-2001	2001
Church of Santa Monica Historical Landmark	Panay, Capiz	1884	Commonly known as Panay Church, it was initially built in 1774, and was rebuilt in 1884 after the former structure was damaged by a typhoon. The church contains the largest bell in the country.	NMP Declaration 2-2001	2001
Cathedral of San Jose	Romblon, Romblon	17th century	Spanish colonial-era church known for its exquisite retablo. Seat of the Diocese of Romblon	National Cultural Treasure marker of Romblon Cathedral NMP Declaration 2-2001	2001
Church of Malaueg, Cagayan Parish Church of San Raymundo de Peñaforte	Rizal (Malaueg), Cagayan	1617	Spanish colonial-era church established by the Dominicans. Noted for its compact architecture and extensive use of fired brick.	NMP Declaration 2-2001	2001
1 2 Church Complex and Camposanto of San Joaquin	San Joaquin, Iloilo	(1) 1869 (2) 1892	The (1) San Joaquin Parish church is a Spanish colonial era baroque church hewn from coral stone. Famous for the relief of the Rendicion de Tetuan on its facade. The (2) Camposanto de San Joaquin is a catholic cemetery built in the Spanish colonial era famous for its impressive mortuary chapel. Added to the NCT declaration of the Church of San Joaquin in 2015.	San Joaquin Church NMPP Marker, Iloilo (1)NMP Declaration 2-2001	(1) 2001 (2) 2015
Church of Tabaco Historical Landmark	Tabaco, Albay	1879	Founded in 1664, the present church was built by the seculars in 1864 and completed in 1879.	Museum Declaration 2-2001	2001
Saint Ildefonsus of Toledo Parish (Tanay, Rizal; 08-14-2021) Parish Church of San Ildefonso	Tanay, Rizal	1783	This Spanish colonial-era church is famed for the native inspired depiction of the Stations of the cross.	NMP Declaration 2-2001	2001
Minor Basilica of Saint Michael the Archangel (Lopez Jaena, Tayabas, Quezon; 10-08-2022) Tayabas Basilica 1 3 6 Spanish Colonial-Era Church Complexes (Note: Outbuildings in the 2018 expansion of declaration of NCT to the Tayabas Basilica.)	Tayabas, Quezon	1894	Also known as the Basilica Minore de San Miguel Arkangel, this Spanish colonial-era church is famous for its key-shaped layout and its long nave. In 2018, the site was expanded to include: 1. The Ermita de Nuestra Señora de las Angustias; 2. The Site and Extant Remains of the Ermita de San Diego de Alcala; 3. Santuario de las Almas; 4. The Site Remains of the Cementerio de los Españoles; 5. The Capilla Mortuario; 6. The Cementerio de los Indios	National Cultural treasure marker of St. Michael the Archangel Basilica in Tayabas city, Quezon (cropped) NMP Declaration 2-2001 Expansion: MD-NO.1-2018	2001
Parish Church of Santa Catalina de Alejandria	Tayum, Abra	1803	19th-century Spanish colonial-era Baroque church	NMP Declaration 2-2001	2001
Allan Jay Quesada – Tumauini Cathedral – afternoon exterior DSC 0158 Church of San Mattias, Tumauini	Tumauini, Isabela	1783	The Tumauini Church is ultrabaroque in style and entirely made of bricks. Its belfry is the only known Spanish colonial-era cylindrical tower in the country.	NMP Declaration 2-2001	2001
Las Piñas Bamboo Organ	Las Piñas	1824	The Bamboo Organ is the only known oldest and largest bamboo organ existing in the world today with a unique and distinct sound as compared to other pipe organs, built by Fr. Diego Cera	Las Piñas Bamboo Organ National Cultural Treasure plaque NMP Declaration No. 01-2003	2003
Cape Bojeador Lighthouse Historical Landmark	Burgos, Ilocos Norte	1892	Spanish colonial-era Lighthouse made of brick and wood. Still in use, the site is managed by the Philippine coast guard		2005
Relief Map of Mindanao	Dapitan, Zamboanga del Norte	1892	Jose Rizal made this map from August to September 1892 assisted by Francisco Paula de Sanchez, his teacher in Ateneo de Manila. It was intended as a way for teaching geography and history to Rizal's pupils in Dapitan and part of Rizal's beautification project to the town plaza.		2005
Daraga Church	Daraga, Albay	1773	The church is known for its Churrigueresque architectural style in its façade, a fine example of Baroque architecture, and made out of volcanic rocks, which are rich in the area.		2007
Camarin de la Virgen	Santa Ana, Manila	c. 1720–1725	Chapel room inside the Santa Ana Church which functions as the dressing room of the Nuestra Señora delos Desamparados		2008
Maranao Torogan	Pompongan-a-marantao, Marawi, Lanao del Sur	1900	Commonly known as Kawayan Torogan, the specific structure is a traditional Maranao torogan (house) built by Sultan sa Kawayan Makaantal. It is the last standing example of the house of the elite members of the Maranaos, and the only remaining habitable torogan.	NMP Declaration No. 4-2008	2008
Bonifacio National Monument	Caloocan	1933	Known commonly as Monumento, it is a monument designed by the NA Guillermo Tolentino to commemorate Philippine revolutionary Andrés Bonifacio, the founder and Supremo of the Katipunan.		2009
1 2 3 4 University of Santo Tomas Main Building, Arch of the Centuries, Central Seminary and Open Spaces	Sampaloc, Manila	1611	The University of Santo Tomas itself was established in 1611, possessing the oldest extant university charter in Asia. In 1927, the (1) UST Main Building was re-established in its current location. The (2) Arch of the Centuries, first constructed in 1680, was transferred in the new campus in 1954 from the original site of UST in Intramuros which was destroyed during World War 2. The (3) Central Seminary is the only Pontifical Seminary in the Philippines and the whole of Asia. The (4) open space was the venue of holy mass celebrated by His Holiness Pope Paul IV during his visit to Asia, and his Holiness Pope John Paul II during the World Youth Day.	NMP Declaration no. 1-2010	2010
Parish Church of the Holy Cross of Maribojoc	Maribojoc, Bohol	1852 to 1872	Spanish colonial era Baroque church built by order made of coral stone and rock.	NMP Declaration No. 2-2010	2010
Metropolitan Theater Historical Landmark	Ermita, Manila	1931	Also known as Manila Metropolitan Theater, the Art Deco building designed by architect and NA Juan M. Arellano.	Interior of Manila Metropolitan Theater and Facade	2010
Baclayon Church Historical Landmark	Baclayon, Bohol	1727	Best-preserved Spanish colonial-era Jesuit stone church in the Philippines		2010
1 2 Nuestra Señora de La Luz Parish Church Complex	Loon, Bohol	1864	The (1) Loon Church is an expansive and grand example of Recollect Baroque Architecture in the Philippines. The declaration includes the (2) Inang-angan coral stone stairway.		2010
1 2 3 6 Bohol Watchtowers (6)	1. Maribojoc, 2. Dauis, 3. Panglao, 4. Baclayon, 5. Loay and 6. Balilihan, Bohol	17th century – 18th century	A series of six watchtowers in Bohol. They include the: 1. Punta Cruz Watchtower; 2. Dauis Watchtower; 3. Panglao Watchtower; 4. Pamilacan Watchtower; 5. Loay Watchtower; 6. Balilihan Watchtower	Declaration No. 11-2011	2011
1 2 3 4 5 6 8 9 Spanish Colonial Bridges of Tayabas	Tayabas, Quezon	1793–1854	A series Spanish colonial era of bridges which include, but are not limited to: 1. Puente de Alitao; 2. Puente de Reina Isabel II; 3. Puente de Don Francisco de Asis; 4. Puente de la Princesa; 5. Puente del Lakawan; 6. Puente del Mate; 7. Puente de la Ese; 8. Puente de las Despedidas; 9. Malagonlong Bridge; 10. Puente de Gibanga		2011
San Nicolas de Tolentino Parish Church Complex and Ermita Ruins	Dimiao, Bohol	19th century	Baroque church surrounded by ruins of the ermita, a walled cemetery containing human skulls exhibiting tooth-filing		2011
Shrine-Parish of the Assumption of the Blessed Virgin Mary Complex; Parish Church of Our Lady of the Assumption of Dauis; Dauis Church Complex Marker	Dauis, Bohol	1697	Spanish colonial era Gothic church built by order made of coral stone and rock.	NMP Declaration No. 12-2011	2011
San Sebastian Church Historical Landmark	Quiapo, Manila	1891	A Neogothic basilica famed as being the only all-steel church in the country.	SanSebastianCathedraljf8747 44 NMP Declaration No. 8-2011	2011
Sta. Monica Parish Church, Minalin, Pampanga (2) Santa Monica Parish Church	Minalin, Pampanga	1834	Spanish colonial-era church made of brick and mortar. Notable for its retablo-like facade.	National Cultural Treasure marker of Minalin Church, Pampanga 02	2011
Santo Domingo Church Complex and its ecclesiastical objects	Quezon City	1954	Also known as the National Shrine of Our Lady of the Holy Rosary of La Naval de Manila, it is the largest church in Metro Manila and one of the biggest churches in Asia and serves as the base of the Dominicans in the Philippines. The church contains murals painted by NA Carlos "Botong" Francisco, which show the life of St. Dominic de Guzman	Santo Domingo Church National Cultural Treasure marker NMP declaration 4, s. 2012	2012
Fort San Andres in Romblon, Romblon 1 1 Twin Forts of Romblon (Fuerza de San Antonio and Fuerza de Santiago)	Romblon, Romblon	1573 and 1760, respectively	Spanish colonial era fortresses which are in (1) San Andres (San Antonio) and (2) Calvary Hills (Santiago)	National Cultural Treasure marker for Fort San Andres in Romblon Island NMP Declaration No. 1-2013	2013
Parish Church of the Holy Trinity, Loay, Bohol	Loay, Bohol	1822	Baroque-Renaissance Spanish Colonial-era church made from cut coral stone.	MD-7-2013; October 22, 2013	2013
Parish Church of the Santo Niño of Cortes	Cortes, Bohol	19th century	Baroque-Renaissance Spanish Colonial-era church made from cut coral stone	MD- 8-2013; October 22, 2013	2013
Jose Rizal National Monument	Ermita, Manila	1913	Entitled Motto Stella (guiding star), the monument is a memorial in Rizal Park made by Richard Kissling built to commemorate the executed Filipino nationalist, José Rizal. The monument contains his bones which were re-interred in 1912.	Jose Rizal National Monument Marker MD-9-2013; November 14, 2013	2013
Santa Barbara Church Complex	Santa Barbara, Iloilo	1845	Baroque-Renaissance, Spanish colonial era Augustinian church. Headquarters of Martin Delgado – General of the Philippine Revolution	Santa Barbara Church NMPP Marker, Iloilo NMP Declaration No. 10-2013	2013
1 2 The Fortifications of Manila : Intramuros and Fort San Antonio Abad	(1) Intramuros, Manila (2) Malate, Manila	(1) 1571- 1862(2) 1584	(1) Intramuros is a walled city, built during the Spanish Colonial Period when it was synonymous with the City of Manila, having been the center of administrative and religious power in the region. (Note: Included in the UNESCO tentative list entitled Colonial Urban Plan and Fortifications of the Walled City of Manila) (2) Spanish colonial era fort famously captured by the British in 1762.	NMP Declaration No. 10-2014	2014
Parish Church of the Santo Tomas de Villanueva of Miagao	Miagao, Iloilo	1797	The Miagao Church was built in the late 18th century during the Spanish colonial period and is dedicated to St Thomas de Villanueva. Excellent example of Earthquake baroque. Part of four churches under the UNESCO World Heritage Site distinction under Baroque Churches of the Philippines		2014
Parish Church of Saint Ignatius of Loyola of Capul	Capul, Northern Samar	1781	A Spanish-era fortress church.		2014
Church of Nuestra Señora de Manaoag	Manaoag, Pangasinan	1701	Includes the image of the Blessed Virgin Mary and movable and intangible properties intrinsic to the cultural significance of the property		2015
Paco Park (Cementerio Municipal De Manila y Capilla de San Pancracio)	Paco, Manila	1822	The cemetery-park is a recreational garden and was once Manila's municipal cemetery built by the Dominicans during the Spanish colonial period. The cemetery was initially built due to a cholera epidemic in the early 19th century. Nationalist Jose Rizal and Priests Gomburza are notable burials.		2015
3 4 5 Watchtowers of Ilocos Norte (6)	Ilocos Norte		Spanish colonial era watchtowers which include: 1. Badoc (Barangay Lingasay); 2. Currimao (Barangay Poblacion Uno); 3. Currimao (Barangay Torre); 4. Belfry of San Guillermo Cathedral in Laoag; 5. Bacarra (Barangay Natba); 6. Pasuquin (Barangay Puyupuyan)		2015
2 4 Watchtowers of Ilocos Sur (4)	Ilocos Sur		Spanish colonial era watchtowers which include: 1. Santiago (Barangay Sabangan); 2. San Esteban (Barangay Bateria); 3. Narvacan (Barangay Sulvec); 4. Belfry of San Agustin Church (Bantay, Ilocos Sur)		2015
1 2 4 La Union Watchtowers	1. Luna; 2. Balaoan; 3. Bacnotan; 4. San Juan; 5. San Fernando; La Union	Spanish colonial era	Spanish colonial era watchtowers which include: 1. Baluarte Watchtower; 2. Almeida Watchtower; 3. Bacnotan watchtower 4. Cartalan watchtower 5. Ili Sur watchtower		2015
Cagsawa ruins Cagsawa Ruins	Daraga, Albay	1724	The present ruins are from the 1724 structure of the church, which was engulfed by a volcanic eruption in 1814. The original structure was built in 1587.		2015
Santa Maria Church Complex and Cemetery	Santa Maria, Ilocos Sur	1765	Spanish colonial-era Baroque brick structure unique in its function as both church and citadel. (Note: Part of 4 churches under the UNESCO world heritage site distinction under Baroque churches of the Philippines) Part of four churches under the UNESCO World Heritage Site distinction under Baroque Churches of the Philippines		2015
Lumang Tulay ng Santa Maria	Santa Maria, Ilocos Sur	1800's	Built during the 19th century, one of the few remaining bridges built by the Spanish Colonial Authorities, the bridge in the town of Santa Maria is made entirely of bricks.		2015
2 3 1 The Retablos Mayor y Menores of the Church of Nuestra Señora de Candelaria and its Church Complex	Silang, Cavite	1595	(1) Spanish colonial-era church in the baroque style with outstanding and culturally significant Rococo altar pieces: the (2) Retablo Mayor and (3) Retablo Menores		2016
National Museum of Fine Arts Building (Old Legislative Building); Old Legislative Building Historical Landmark	Ermita, Manila	1918	Designed Arc. Ralph Harrington Doane and Antonio Toledo. Home of the Philippine Legislature, National Assembly of the Philippines, Commonwealth Congress and the Philippine Congress. Now houses the National Museum of Fine Arts	NMP Declaration No. 07-2016	2016
National Museum of Natural History Building (Old Agriculture and Commerce; and DOT Building)	Manila	1930s	A neoclassic building designed by architect Antonio Toledo during the Philippine Commonwealth era. Now houses the National Museum of Natural History	NMP Declaration No. 05-2016	2016
1 2 Camiguin Archaeological Sites Sunken Cemetery (and) Old Bonbon Church Ruins	Catarman, Camiguin	1. 1853	The (1) Sunken Cemetery and the (2) Church of Bonbon ruins are Spanish colonial era sites in Catarman destroyed during the eruption of Mt. Hibok-Hibok	NMP Declaration No. 1-2017	2016
Guinsiliban Moro Watchtower	Guinsiliban, Camiguin		Spanish colonial era brick watchtower believed to be part of a larger structure used to guard the location from pirate attacks	NMP Declaration No. 1-2017	2016
Pila Archaeological Site	Pila, Laguna	12th century	Also known as the Locsin Archaeological site, contains Iron age artifacts from the precolonial settlement of Pinagbayanan		2016
Capilla de San Pancracio	Caloocan	1884	Mortuary Chapel of the La Loma Cemetery. Oldest extant funerary chapel and cemetery grounds in Manila		2016
Quezon Bridge	Manila	1939	Art deco steel bridge designed by NA Juan Arellano built during the Philippine Commonwealth era. Restored after being badly damaged during the Liberation of Manila.	NMP Declaration No. 02-2016	2016
1 2 3 4 Colonial Monuments of Manila	Intramuros, Manila	19th Century	Monuments of monarchs and leaders during near the end of the Spanish colonial era.: 1. Rey Carlos IV; 2. Reina Isabel II; 3. Simon de Anda Monument; 4. Legaspi-Urdaneta monument	NMP Declaration No. 09-2016	2016
Ayusan-Paoa Bridge (Puente de Paoa)	Vigan, Ilocos Sur	1852	Spanish colonial era brick arch bridge		2016
Arch of Pagsanjan Stone Arch of Pagsanjan	Pagsanjan, Laguna	1878	Arch was built by the locals to express gratitude to the Our Lady of Guadalupe for protecting the town from bandits		2016
2012-06-23-Cultural Center of the Philippines-Evening Tanghalang Pambansa of the Cultural Center of the Philippines by NA Arch. Leandro Locsin	Pasay	1969	Designed by NA Leandro Locsin, this brutalist structure contains theatres and exhibition halls. The declaration also includes the following works: 1. Brass Sculptural Relief "the Seven Arts" by NA Vicente Manansala; 2. Woven Curtain "Genesis" by NA H. R. Ocampo; 3. Untitled Triptych Painting of NA Cesar T. Legaspi; 4. Painting "Black and White" by NA Arturo Luz; 5. Untitled Woven Curtain by Roberto Chabet		2018
Abbey of Our Lady of Monserrat, San Beda University	San Miguel, Manila	1925	Neo-gothic church of the San Beda University managed by the Benedictines		2017
The Facade of the National Shrine of Our Mother of Perpetual Help, Baclaran, Parañaque, Philippines. National Shrine of Our Mother of Perpetual Help	Baclaran, Paranaque	1958	Colloquially known as Baclaran church, this Romanesque revival church is the headquarters of the Manila Vice Province of the Redemptorists.		2017
Main Building & Complex of Quezon Institute by NA Juan Nakpil	Quezon City	1938	An art deco hospital designed by NA Juan Nakpil focused on the treatment of tuberculosis		2018
San Pablo de Cabagan Casa Real Ruins	San Pablo, Isabela	1624	Ruins of a Spanish colonial-era Baroque church and Casa Real		2018
1 2 3 Buildings of the Philippine Normal University	Taft Avenue, Ermita, Manila	Early 1920s	The National Center for teacher education, established during the American occupation in 1901. Includes: 1. Normal Hall; 2. Geronima T. Pecson Hall (main building); 3. PNU Faculty Center	Marker declaring the Buildings of the Philippine Normal University in Manila as an Important Cultural Property NMP Declaration no. 1 – 2018	2018
Original Sculpture in concrete and cast in bronze of "Oblation" by NA Guillermo Tolentino	Diliman, Quezon City	1939	Depicts a man facing upward with arms outstretched which became a symbol of the University of the Philippines. Sculpted by NA Guillermo Tolentino		2018
1 3 4 5 Cavite Puerto	Cavite City	Spanish colonial era	Seaport area established during the Spanish colonial period. Includes: 1. Ramon Quijano Samonte Park; 2. Cavite Naval Station; 3. Bell Tower of Church of Sta. Monica; 4. Main Gate and Western Part of Fort San Felipe; 5. Site vestiges and archaeological remains of the Spanish colonial era fortifications, shipyards, public monuments, buildings, churches and religious buildings, houses and private establishments, street and other infrastructure together with associated anchorages and underwater sites in Bacoor Bay and Canacao Bay.		2018
1 2 3 12 Buildings of the Far Eastern University	Sampaloc, Manila	1938–1950	The six buildings of the university is recognized for its well-preserved Art Deco and International style buildings designed by National Artist Pablo Antonio and his son Pablo Jr. Includes: 1. Nicanor Reyes Sr. Hall; 2. Administration Building; 3. Admissions Building, formerly the Engineering Building or the East Asia Building; 4. Architecture and Fine Arts Building, formerly the Law Building; 5. Science Building; 6. FEU Chapel. Also includes artwork 7. Nicanor Reyes Memorial Square Bronze Sculptures -NA Vicente Manansala; 8. Tiled Mosaic of Our Lady of Fatima – by NA Vicente Manansala; 9. The Stations of the Cross – by NA Carlos "Botong" Francisco; 10. Crucifixion – by NA Carlos "Botong" Francisco; 11. Stained Glass Panels and Empowering the Youth Through Education Mural by Antonio Dumlao; 12. Bas Reliefs by Francesco Riccardo Monti	Marker declaring the Buildings of the Far Eastern University in Manila as an Important Cultural Property Museum Declaration no. 1-2018	2018
Fort Nuestra Señora de Guadalupe, and its Intrinsic Natural Setting at Tubigan Point	San Jose de Buenavista, Antique	16th century	Spanish colonial-era fort	MD No. 13-2020	2019
1 3 6 7 Spanish Colonial Era Fortifications of Palawan and its intrinsic natural setting	1. Taytay; 2. Dumaran; 3. Culion; 4. Linapacan; 5. Agutaya; 6. Cuyo; 7. Cagayancillo; 8. Balabac		Series of Spanish colonial era forts in the Province of Palawan. Includes: 1. Fuerza Sta. Isabel; 2. Fort Dumaran; 3. Fort Culion; 4. Fort Linapacan; 5. Fort Agutaya; 6. Fort Cuyo; 7. Fort Cagayancillo; 8. Fort Balabac	MD No. 14-2020 (June 27, 2019)	2019
Sandugo	Tagbilaran, Bohol		Monument commemorating the Blood compact of Spanish explorer Miguel López de Legazpi and Datu Sikatuna, the chieftain of Bohol. Work by NA Napoleon V. Abueva	MD-9-2020	2019
Old Bridge of Paoay	Paoay, Ilocos Norte	19th century	A single-arch brick baroque bridge near the Paoay church	NMP declaration no. 34-2020	2020
Quezon Memorial Shrine	Quezon City	1978	Memorial and Final Resting Place of Manuel L. Quezon – First President of the Philippine Commonwealth, and Aurora A. Quezon, First Lady	NMP Declaration No. 29-2020	2020
2 3 1 Church Complex of Nuestra Señora de Caysasay	Taal, Batangas		Spanish colonial-era church complex brought about by the devotion of the people to the Our Lady of Caysasay. Includes the: 1. Archdiocesan Shrine of Our Lady of Caysasay; 2. San Lorenzo Ruiz Steps; 3. Balon de Sta. Lucia	National cultural treasure marker for the church complex of Nuestra Señora de Caysasay in Taal, Batangas NMP Declaration No. 32-2020	2020
Casa Rocha	Tagbilaran, Bohol	1831	Oldest Bahay na bato in the province of Bohol. Acquired by the National Museum in 2020.	NMP Panel of Experts Resolution No. 2-2020	2020
Severino Alberto Building, site of the Panciteria Macanista de Buen Gusto mentioned in El Filibusterismo	Binondo, Manila	1880s	Site of the Panciteria Macanista de Buen Gusto, a Spanish colonial-era restaurant mentioned in El Filibusterismo.		2020
Fort San Pedro with its Intrinsic Setting Relative to its Immediate Surrounding	Cebu City	1738	Oldest triangular bastion Spanish colonial era fort in the country	NMP Declaration No. 12-2020	2020
Malacañang Sa Sugbo/Aduana Building	Cebu City	1910	Formerly a customs building and the official residence of the President of the Philippines in Cebu. Now the National Museum of the Philippines – Cebu	NMP Declaration No. 12-2020	2020
Plaza Independencia with its Intrinsic Setting Relative to its Immediate Surrounding	Cebu City			NMP Declaration No. 12-2020	2020
The Monument to Miguel Lopez De Legaspi with its Intrinsic Setting Relative to its Immediate Surrounding	Cebu City		Monument to conquistador Miguel Lopez de Legaspi	NMP Declaration No. 12-2020	2020
1 3 Watchtowers of Quezon	1. Gumaca; 2. Pitogo; 3. Atimonan; 4. Unisan; 5. Macalelon	(2) 1766 (3) 1752 (5)1855	Spanish colonial-era watchtowers used by the locals to guard their territories against Moro and pirate raids. Includes: 1. Kutang San Diego in Gumaca; 2. Kutang San Pablo in Pitogo; 3. Iskong Bantay in Atimonan; 4. Kutang San Pablo or Moog Bantayan in Unisan; 5. Kastilyo Watchtower in Macalelon	Museum Declaration no. 54-2020	2020
Limestone tombs of Kamhantik (Philippines) Mt. Kamhantik Archaeological site	Mulanay, Quezon	c. 9th century	Site of a 9th-century burial site which features limestone coffins.		2020
1 2 3 Church Complex, Municipio, Asilo and Escuela of San Vicente, Ilocos sur	San Vicente, Ilocos Sur	1795	The complex is an excellent example of Spanish colonial landscape planning. Includes: 1. Saint Vincent Ferrer Parish Church Complex; 2. San Vicente Municipio (Municipal Hall); 3. Asilo de San Vicente (Palacio del Gobernador Building); 4. Old Building of the Escuela (San Vicente Integrated School)		2020
Church Complex of San Vicente Ferrer Parish	Calape, Bohol	1802	Neo-gothic church established by the Augustinian recollects.	NMP Declaration No. 59-2020	2020
Budiao Church ruins	Daraga, Albay	1798	Ruins of a Spanish colonial-era baroque church destroyed during the eruption of Mt. Mayon	NMP Declaration No. 40-2020	2020
Taytay-Boni Bridge (Puente de Boni)	Miag-ao, Iloilo	1854	Spanish colonial-era coral stone bridge	NMP Declaration No. 36-2000	2020
Watchtower of Sitio Torre, Gabu Sur	Laoag, Ilocos Norte		One of the two Spanish colonial era watchtowers in Gabu Sur, Laoag		2020
1 2 Basilica del Santo Niño and Convent Pavilion of Magellan's Cross	Cebu City	18th century	1. Formally called the Basilica Minore del Señor Santo Niño, it is a Spanish colonial-era Baroque church which houses the Sto. Niño de Cebu and Ecce Homo, two of the oldest Christian artifacts in the country.; 2. A pavilion that houses the Magellan's Cross, a Christian cross supposedly planted by Magellan upon his arrival to the islands in 1521	Sto. Niño Basilica as National Cultural Property, Cebu City 1	2021
1 2 Philippine International Convention Center	Pasay	1976	Asia's first convention center designed by National Artist Leandro Locsin. The declaration includes the following as NCT: 1. Concrete Sculpture "Anito" by NA Arturo Luz; 2. Steel Sculpture "Grid' by NA Arturo Luz; 3. Painting "Pagdiriwang" by NA Jose T. Joya; 4. Carved Wooden Furniture by NA Napoleon Abueva		2022
Sheikh Karim-ul Makhdum Mosque	Simunul, Tawi-Tawi	1380	Known as the birthplace of Islam in the Philippines built by Arab trader and missionary Makhdum Karim in 1380		
Shell Midden sites	1. Lal-lo; 2. Gattaran; Cagayan	Neolithic era	A prehistoric dumpsite of mostly mollusk shells revealing information about eating habits and diets of ancient ancestors (Note: Included in the UNESCO world heritage site tentative list entitled Prehistoric Sites of the Cagayan Valley Basin)		
Binangonan Church	Binangonan, Rizal	18th century	Spanish colonial era Baroque church		2025
The details of the Catholic Church of Morong. San Geronimo Parish church (Morong Church) and its ecclesiastical objects	Morong, Rizal	1620	Spanish colonial era Baroque church		2025
The façade of Baras Church. Diocesan Shrine and Parish of St. Joseph (Baras Church)	Baras, Rizal	1686	Spanish colonial era Baroque church, oldest Josephian parish on the Southern Tagalog mainland		2025
Maligcong Rice Terraces	Bontoc, Mountain Province			NCCA Commission Declaration No. 2024-03	2026

UNESCO World Heritage Site
Tentative UNESCO World Heritage Site
Work of a National Artist of the Philippines
Work of a National Hero of the Philippines

== Intangible National Cultural Treasures ==
Official NCT Name	Associated Location/s	Period	Description	Legal Basis/Official marker	Year declared
Bayi, a bamboo bow from Mindoro 1 Philippine Paleographs (Hanunoo, Build, Tagbanua and Pala'wan)	Mindoro and Palawan		Ancient Philippine scripts which include: 1. Hanunoo; 2. Buid; 3. Tagbanua; 4. Pala'wan; (Note: The four scripts were inscribed in the UNESCO Memory of the World Programme, under the name Philippine Paleographs)	NMP Declaration No. 001-97	(as a whole) 1997: 4. 1974
Rice farming is a significant part of the local economy and culture, with traditional practices deeply rooted in the community The Hudhud Chants of the Ifugao	Ifugao province	unknown	The Hudhud consists of 200 narrative chants traditionally performed by the Ifugao community, most especially in the process of the rice harvest	NMP Declaration No. 002-01	2001
Folklore of the popular heritage of the State of the Philippines 16 The Darangen Epic of the Maranao People of Lake Lanao	Lake Lanao, Lanao del Sur	AD 100	An ancient pre-Islamic epic song that encompasses a wealth of knowledge of the Maranao people who live in the Lake Lanao region of Mindanao. (Note: Designated as UNESCO Intangible Cultural Heritage in 2008.)	Declaration No. 01-2002	2002

== National Cultural Treasure Petitions ==
Site/ Object/ Practice name	Locations	Petitioner/s	Description	Reference
Vista Parcial del Pueblo de Angono Y Laguna de Bae (Morong) by Juan Senson	Bangko Sentral ng Pilipinas, Manila		An oil-on-canvas painting by Juan "Tandang Juancho" Senson is slated to become a National Cultural Treasure (NCT). The announcement of its pending declaration was made by Angono Cultural Heritage Office Director Prof. James Owen Saguinsin during the declaration ceremony for another NCT Baptism of Christ by the same artist.	
Our Lady of Light of Cainta Our Lady of Light (Inang Santissima ng Kaliwanagan) by National Artist Fernando Amorsolo	Diocesan Shrine and Parish of Our Lady of Light, Cainta, Rizal	Diocesan Shrine and Parish of Our Lady of Light Cainta, Rizal	A painting of Nuestra Señora de Lumen painted by National Artist Fernando Amorsolo. A notice asking comments from the public was posted at the National Commission for Culture and the Arts (NCCA) Facebook page.	
1 2 3 4 Complex of Malacañang Heritage Mansions	Manila and Baguio	Office of the President of the Philippines	Series of heritage mansions linked with the development and association of Malacañang Palace as the home of the Philippine president and the seat of government in the Philippines. A notice asking comments from the public was posted at the National Commission for Culture and the Arts (NCCA) Facebook page. The structures are as follows: 1. Goldenberg Mansion in San Miguel, Manila; 2. Teus Mansion in San Miguel, Manila, 3. Mansion House in Baguio, and 4. Kalayaan Hall within the Malacañang palace complex; Furthermore, the petition also asks the following structures to be declared as Important cultural property (ICP) : Laperal Mansion in San Miguel, Manila, Bahay Ugnayan in San Miguel, Manila, and; Malacañang Park	
Diocesan Shrine and Parish of Saint Augustine Saint Augustine Parish Church	Baliwag, Bulacan		In February 2026, a petition was filed by the Diocese of Malolos to have the church, which was built between 1733 and 1734 by Augustinian missionaries, declared an NCT. In August 2026, the church was declared an important cultural property by the National Commission for Culture and the Arts.	

== See also ==
- Lists of Cultural Properties of the Philippines
- List of historical markers of the Philippines
- Tourism in the Philippines

== Sources ==
- "List of National Cultural Treasures and Important Cultural Properties of the Philippines". Official Gazette of the Republic of the Philippines. Archived from the original on December 10, 2017.
