= List of artwork by Jose Rizal =

This article lists the visual artwork done by José Rizal, Filipino polymath and a national hero of the Philippines.

== Background ==
Jose Rizal, among many other things, was also a trained artist. He was trained at the Academia de Dibujo y Pintura in Manila and the training shop of Romualdo de Jesus in Santa Cruz, Manila. He entered medical school at the University of Santo Tomas, where his sketching and drawing was refined by his anatomy classes.

In Spain, he studied medicine and, literature and philosophy at the Universidad Central de Madrid and sculpture, drawing and art in San Carlos University.

He was among the illustrados, Filipino intelligentsia of the Spanish colonial period, where he would collaborate with other elite Filipino artisans Juan Luna, Felix Resurreccion Hidalgo and Félix Pardo de Tavera. They influenced each other's creative output, with him sometimes posing as character references for paintings.

His work, celebrated by his countrymen are displayed in private collections and national institutions like the National Museum of Fine Arts in Manila and the Rizal Shrine in Intramuros, however many are destroyed during the Liberation of Manila.

== 3-dimensional art ==
Rizal is known to have created 56 sculptural works, 18 of which are still in existence, which range from different mediums such as wood, clay and plaster-of-paris.

=== Wood ===
Image	Title	Location	Notes	Link
Default sculpture icon	Untitled self-portrait	Private Collection	Early self-portrait in wood done in 1879. Sold at auction.	
Default sculpture icon	Untitled Bas Relief	Private Collection	Resurfaced work depicting an athletic man lifting a barbel. Sold at auction	
Sacred Heart of Jesus by Dr. Jose P. Rizal, snippet from Lineage, Life and Labors of José Rizal, Philippine Patriot A Study of the Growth of Free Ideas in the Trans-Pacific American Territory By Austin Craig · 1913	Sacred Heart of Jesus	Ateneo de Manila University	Carved at age 14 of Baticuling wood. The image left at Rizal's cell in Intramuros.	
Default sculpture icon	Image of the Virgin Mary	unknown	"Partner" to the Sacred Heart of Jesus	
Josephine Bracken wood carving	Josephine Bracken (Bas Relief)	unknown	Bas Relief depicting Josephine Bracken, Rizal's Wife	
Wooden bust of Francisco Mercado by Dr. Jose Rizal. Snippet from Lineage, Life and Labors of José Rizal, Philippine Patriot A Study of the Growth of Free Ideas in the Trans-Pacific American Territory By Austin Craig · 1913	Bust of Francisco Mercado	unknown	Wooden bust of his father, Francisco Mercado	

=== Clay, terracotta, plaster ===
Image	Title	Location	Notes	Link
This is the copy of Triumph of Science Rizal sculpture given by Jose Rizal to Ferdinand Blumentritt	The Triumph of Science over Death	Exhibited at the Dresden Museum of Modern Art, now at Rizal Shrine, Intramuros	Allegorical work symbolizing science illuminating the world. Gift to Ferdinand Blumentritt.	
Sculpture given by Jose Rizal to Ferdinand Blumentritt	The Triumph of Death over Life	Exhibited at the Dresden Museum of Modern Art, now at Rizal Shrine, Intramuros	Allegorical work representing the death as a hooded skeleton embracing a woman. Gift to Ferdinand Blumentritt.	
Original copy of the sculpture gifted to Ferdinand Blumentritt by Jose Rizzal	Prometheus Bound	Exhibited at the Dresden Museum of Modern Art, now at Rizal Shrine, Intramuros	Representation of Greek god Prometheus. Gift to Ferdinand Blumentritt, now at Rizal Shrine, Intramuros	
La venganza de la madre (The Mother's Revenge)	La venganza dela madre (A Mother's Revenge)	National Museum of Fine Arts in Manila	Known to be an allegorical representation of the condition of the Philippines in the Spanish colonial period. Declared National Cultural Treasure in 2008	
San Pablo Ermitaño	San Pablo el Ermitaño	National Museum of Fine Arts in Manila	A representation of St. Paul the First Hermit	
Default sculpture icon	Oyang Dapitana	originals unknown	A representation of a laundry woman.	
	Bust of Ricardo Carcinero	National Museum of Fine Arts in Manila	Bust of Ricardo Carcinero, Spanish Politico Military Governor of Dapitan, Zamboanga del Norte	
Default sculpture icon	Jabali (Baboy Ramo)	Private collection	Depicts wild boar, sold at auction	
Default sculpture icon	Composite Statuette	unknown	A nude woman reclining	
a sculpture by Dr. Jose Rizal, snippet from Lineage, Life and Labors of José Rizal, Philippine Patriot A Study of the Growth of Free Ideas in the Trans-Pacific American Territory By Austin Craig · 1913	Model head of a Dapitan girl	unknown	A young girl from Dapitan	
Bust of Fr. Jose Guerrico, Jesuit Teacher from Ateneo Municipal, screenshot from Lineage, Life and Labors of José Rizal, Philippine Patriot A Study of the Growth of Free Ideas in the Trans-Pacific American Territory By Austin Craig · 1913	Bust of Father Jose Guerrico	unknown	Bust of Fr. Jose Guerrico, Jesuit teacher from Ateneo Municipal. Received a gold medal at the St. Louis (1904) Exposition	
Snippet from Lineage, Life and Labors of José Rizal, Philippine Patriot A Study of the Growth of Free Ideas in the Trans-Pacific American Territory By Austin Craig · 1913	San Francisco de Padua	unknown	Image of Catholic saint, Anthony of Padua	
Default sculpture icon	Josephine Sleeping	Private collection of the descendants of Narcisa Rizal.	Plaster model of his wife, Josephine Bracken. Resurfaced and was auctioned of by the Leon Gallery. Currently on display at the National Museum of Fine arts in Manila.	

=== Others ===
- Orate Frantes (let us pray brethren), wax figure
- Untitled chalk pipe of a girl (gift to his father)
- Biscuit molds, wood
- Wooden tops, wood

== 2-dimensional art ==
This section lists notable works of 2-dimensional art by Rizal. As an artist, he created numerous sketches and doodles scattered throughout papers and sketchpads which he carried around in his travels. He was also an accomplished painter which used oil paints, lacquer and watercolors.

Image	Title	Location	Medium	Notes	Link
Portrait of Saturnina Rizal Hidalgo by Dr. Jose P. Rizal snippet from Lineage, Life and Labors of José Rizal, Philippine Patriot A Study of the Growth of Free Ideas in the Trans-Pacific American Territory By Austin Craig · 1913	Portrait of Saturnina Rizal	Rizal Shrine, Intramuros	oil	Painting depicting Rizal's eldest sister, Saturnina Rizal Hidalgo	
Default 2D icon	Dapitan church curtains	Used to be at the Ateneo de Manila University	oil	Used as a backdrop for a senakulo, a holy week play in Dapitan Catholic Church. Destroyed during WWII	
The Monkey and The Turtle 3	The Turtle and the Monkey		Ink on paper	Illustrations on The Turtle and the Monkey, a children's book he created. Considered by many to be the first Filipino comic book.	
	Untitled self-portrait	unknown	unknown	A shirtless self-portrait of a young Rizal	
Default 2D icon	Untitled landscape	unknown	oil on mother-of-pearl	Given as a token to Doña Leonor Valenzuela and later passed on to Doña Margarita Valenzuela	
Default 2D icon	Spanish coat-of-arms	unknown	watercolor	Done during a fiesta of San Rafael in Calamba in 1867	
Default 2D icon	Allegory on a pair of porcelain vases of the new year celebration	unknown	oil on porcelain		
Default 2D icon	Christ crucified	unknown	crayon		
Default 2D icon	Immaculate concepcion	unknown	crayon		
Default 2D icon	Portrait of Morayta	unknown	crayon	Depicts Miguel Morayta	
	Cover of Noli me Tangere	National Library of the Philippines	Ink on paper	The cover depicts symbols of the Filipino condition during the Spanish colonial period	
View of a public square in Berlin	Vista de Gendarmenmarkt en Berlin	National Museum of Fine arts of the Philippines	Graphite on paper	View of a public square in Berlin drawn up by Rizal during a visit.	
	Imitaion of Japanese art	unknown	Ink on paper	Sketch imitating Japanese art	
Default 2D icon	Portrait of a European Gentleman	Salcedo Auction house	Charcoal on paper	Sketch of a male human head. Provenance comes from a descendant of Narcisa Mercado Rizal. Set to be auctioned off.	

== Other ==
- Relief map of Mindanao, a landscaping feature in front of Dapitan Catholic church, declared National Cultural Treasure
