= Carlos IV monument in Intramuros =

Coordinates: 14°35′32″N 120°58′23″E

Carlos IV Monument
- Spanish: Monumento al Rey Carlos IV; Filipino: Monumento ni Haring Carlos Ikaapat
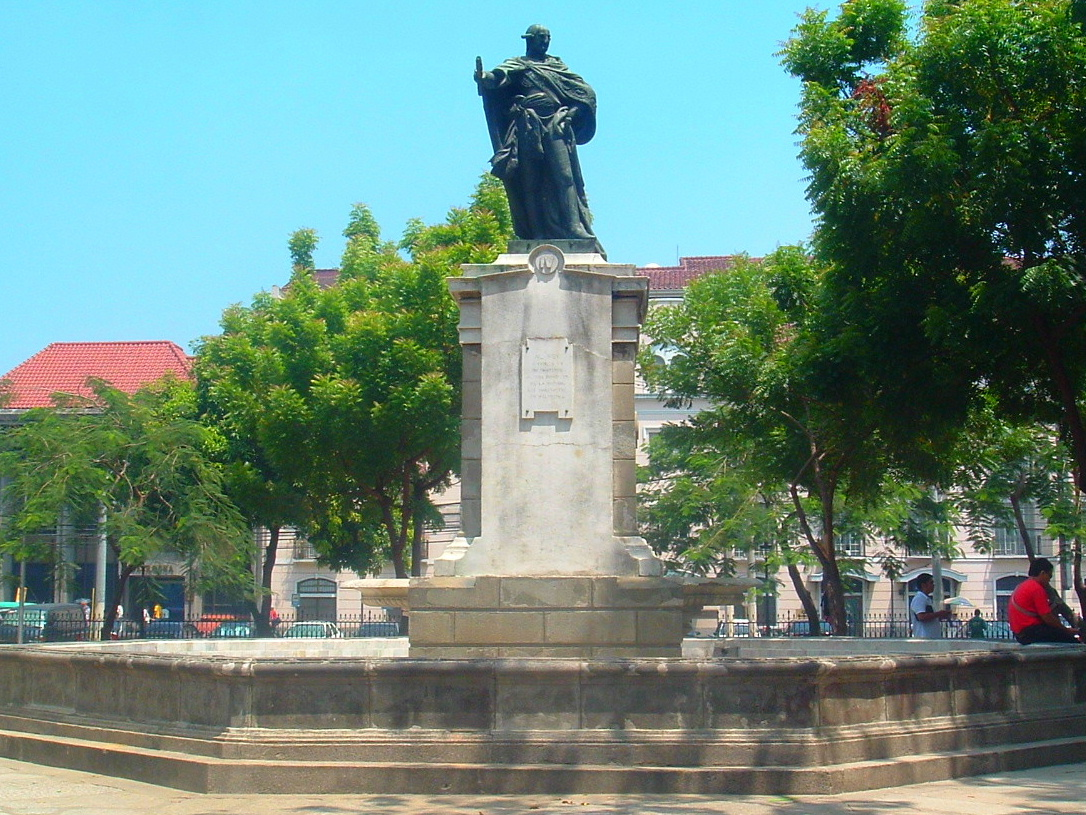
- Interactive map of Carlos IV Monument
- Location: Plaza de Roma, Intramuros, Manila
- Designer: Juan Adán
- Fabricator: Filipino and Chinese artisans from the Maestranza Associated individuals: Mateo Villanueva, Felipe Alonso, Damian Domingo
- Material: bronze, jasper, ashlar
- Dedicated date: 1824 fountain added:1886
- Dismantled date: 1960s, replaced by the Gomburza National Monument
- Restored to original location 1981 by the Intramuros Administration

The Carlos IV monument (Spanish: Monumento al Rey Carlos IV) is a monument in Plaza de Roma, Intramuros, Manila dedicated to Spanish king Charles IV.

== Background ==
In 1803, Spanish king Charles IV approved a ten-year expedition to spread the vaccination against smallpox among the territories in the New World and in Asia. The Royal Philanthropic Vaccine Expedition (Spanish: Real Expedición Filantrópica de la Vacuna) also known as the Balmis Expedition, led by Dr. Francisco Javier de Balmis arrived in the Philippines in 1805 from Acapulco, Mexico. With them are 22 Mexican orphan boys (ages 8 to 10) which were live carriers of cowpox.

The vaccine was accepted by the populace of the territory, however with initial apprehension from some. The expedition in the Philippines yielded 20,000 vaccinated individuals. Later a vaccination center was organized in Manila.

== Commission and creation ==
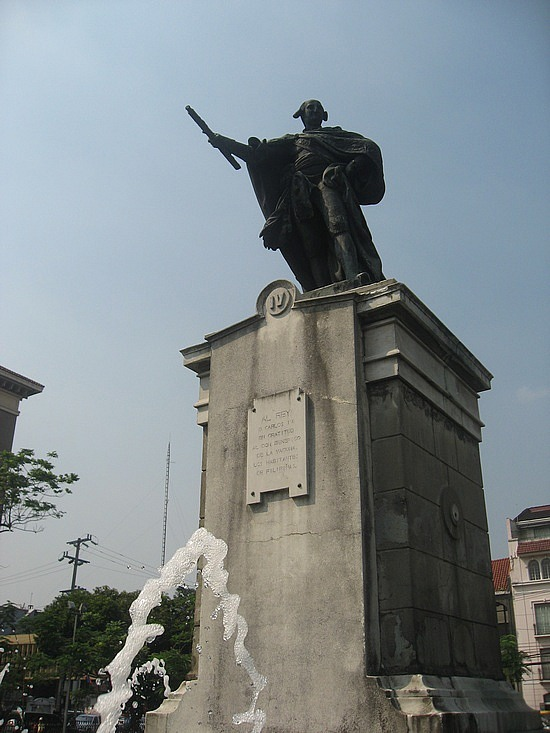
Current Carlos IV monument in Plaza de Roma

In 1796, Spanish sculptor Juan Adan was commissioned by the Government of Spain to create a monument to Carlos IV in Manila. The statue was manufactured in the Maestranza, a bronze cannon foundry by Filipino and Chinese Artisans, with associated figures Mateo Villanueva, Felipe Alonso and Damian Domingo. Its base was made from jaspers from Mt. Mariveles in Bataan and ashlars cut from the Tibagan quarries in Guadalupe, Makati.

The monument was installed in Plaza Mayor (now Plaza de Roma) in front of the Manila Cathedral. In 1886, a fountain was added.

Traditionally, it is considered that the monument was erected as a token of gratitude by the people of Manila to the king for the gift of the vaccine due to its installation after the expedition. Because it was commissioned almost a decade earlier, some have suggested that the statue was created to reinforce Spain's colonial power and might amid the then simmering tensions of certain subjects in the territories (see Novales revolt).

== Design ==
The current iteration of the monument features a pedestal made of cut ashlars, which have a water spout on its left and right.

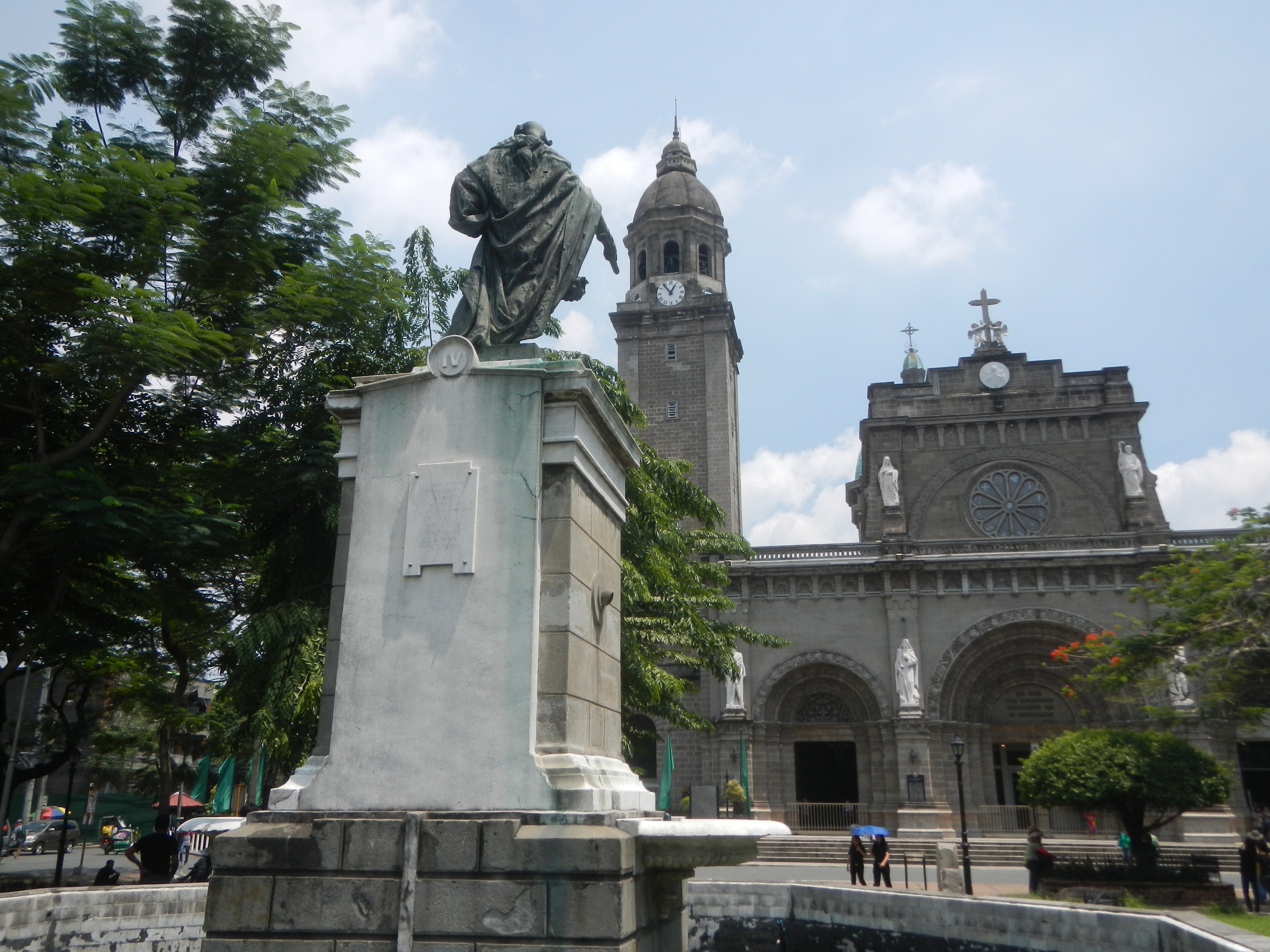
Back of the monument, facing the Manila Cathedral

A granite plaque is front and center of the pedestal with the inscription: AL REY D CARLOS IV EN GRATITUO AL DON BENIFICO DE LA VACUNA LOS HABITANTES DE FILIPINAS (To King Charles IV in gratitude for the beneficial gift of the vaccine to the inhabitants of the Philippines). Another granite plaque can be found at the back of the pedestal with the inscription: LOS FILIPINOS ERIGIERON LA ESTATUA EL AÑO MDCCCXXIV EL AYUNTAMIENTO DE MANILA CONTRIBUYO ESTE FUENTE EL ANO DE MDCCCLXXXVI (The Filipinos erected the statue in the year 1824 the Manila city council contributed this fountain in the year of 1886). A bronze ornamentation bearing the Spanish coat of arms used to be below this granite plaque featured near its base.

Another plaque with a different inscription was supposedly found in its pedestal which tells the statue was installed in the same year 1824, but not because of gratitude for the vaccine but because of a mutiny that almost overthrew the colonial government.

Original Adan proposals for the monument contain lion protomes on top of the pedestal- near the feet of the statue and a crown near the base.

The bronze statue on top of this pedestal depicts Charles IV in royal robes holding a staff, the other arm akimbo, facing the Manila Cathedral. Near its feet in its front and back are the roman numerals IV.

The entire monument is surrounded by a circular fountain which used to have various shrubbery. Original plans depict it without the fountain but surrounded by a wrought iron fence.

== Later history ==
The monument was damaged during the Liberation of Manila which destroyed many structures in its environs. It was largely intact, however, looting saw some of its metal appliques removed.

In the 1960s, waves of nationalistic fervor in the Philippines saw the monument being removed from Plaza de Roma. The allegorical depiction of Filipino Priest-martyrs GomBurZa created by Solomon Saprid was erected on its spot. For years, the monument was relegated to one of the storage rooms of the National Library of the Philippines.

In 1978, President Ferdinand E. Marcos in Letter of Instruction no. 733 ordered the restoration of several parts of Intramuros, which included Plaza de Roma. Work was done by the Intramuros Administration, re-installing it in 1981.

In 2016, the monument was declared National Cultural treasure (NCT) by the National Museum of the Philippines. In 2021, a bronze marker of the declaration was installed along with other Spanish-era statuary also declared NCT.

== See also ==
- Legazpi-Urdaneta Monument
- Queen Isabel II statue
- Magallanes Monument
