= La Union Watchtowers =

Spanish colonial watchtowers in La Union, Philippines

- Mga Bantayán ng La Union (Filipino)
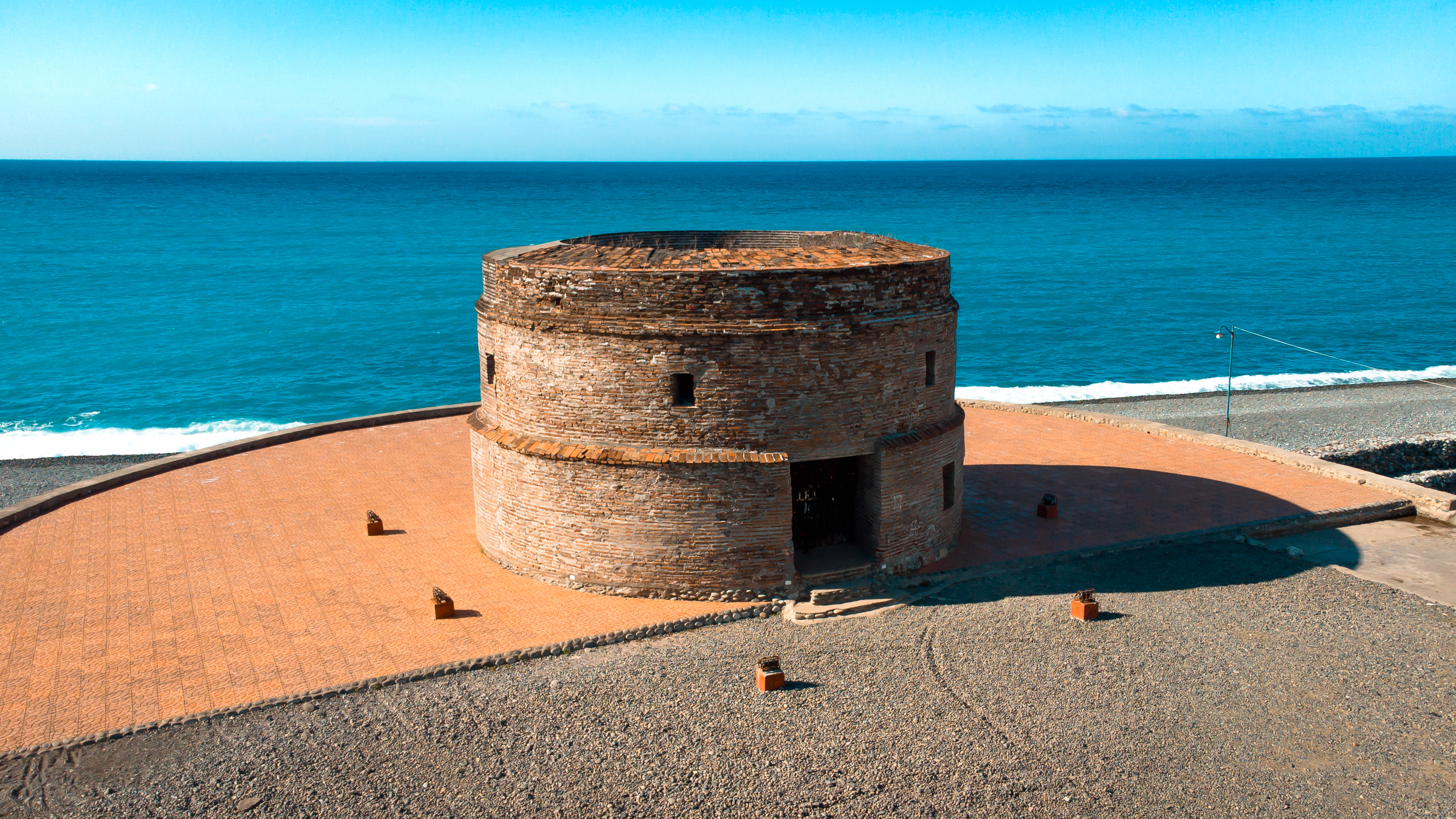
- Baluarte in Luna, La Union
- Type: Watchtowers
- Location: At least five La Union municipalities: Balaoan; Bacnotan; Luna; San Fernando; San Juan

Site notes
- Architectural style: Spanish colonial

National Cultural Treasures
- Official name: La Union Watchtowers
- Designated: 2014

The province of La Union in the Philippines has various Spanish colonial watchtowers (bantayan) which are recognized as National Cultural Treasures since 2014.

== Background ==
In June 1572, Spanish conquistadors led by Juan de Salcedo arrived in the Ilocos Region to subdue the native people and pacify the area. In October 1849, Governor-General Narciso Clavería issued a decree that led to the creation of La Union province, formed by merging towns from Ilocos Sur, Pangasinan, and the western part of the País del Igorrotes (now the Cordillera Administrative Region). This decision was formalized on March 2, 1850, by Governor-General Antonio María Blanco, making La Union the 34th province established since the founding of Cebu in 1565.

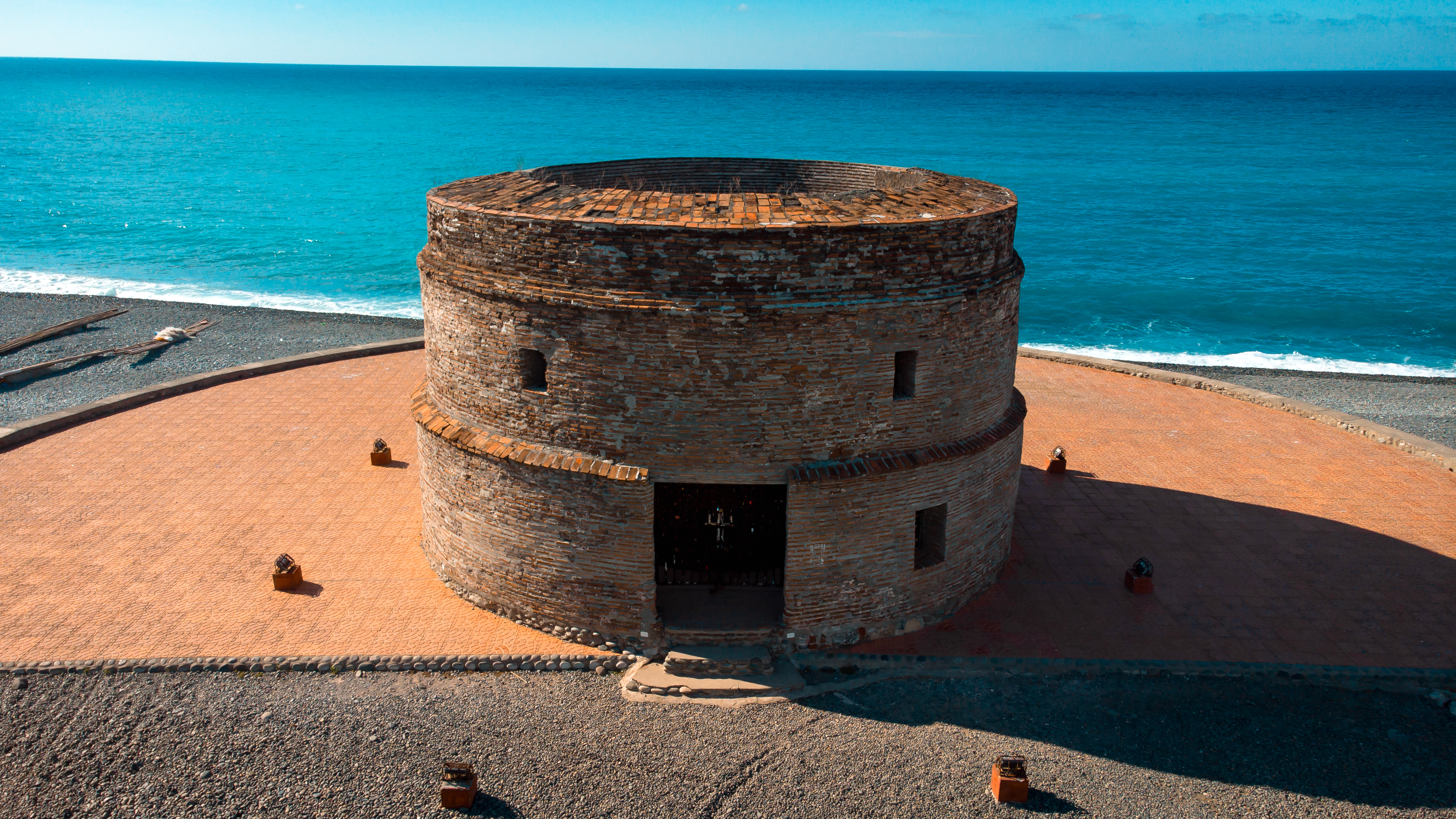
Baluarte Watch Tower, Luna

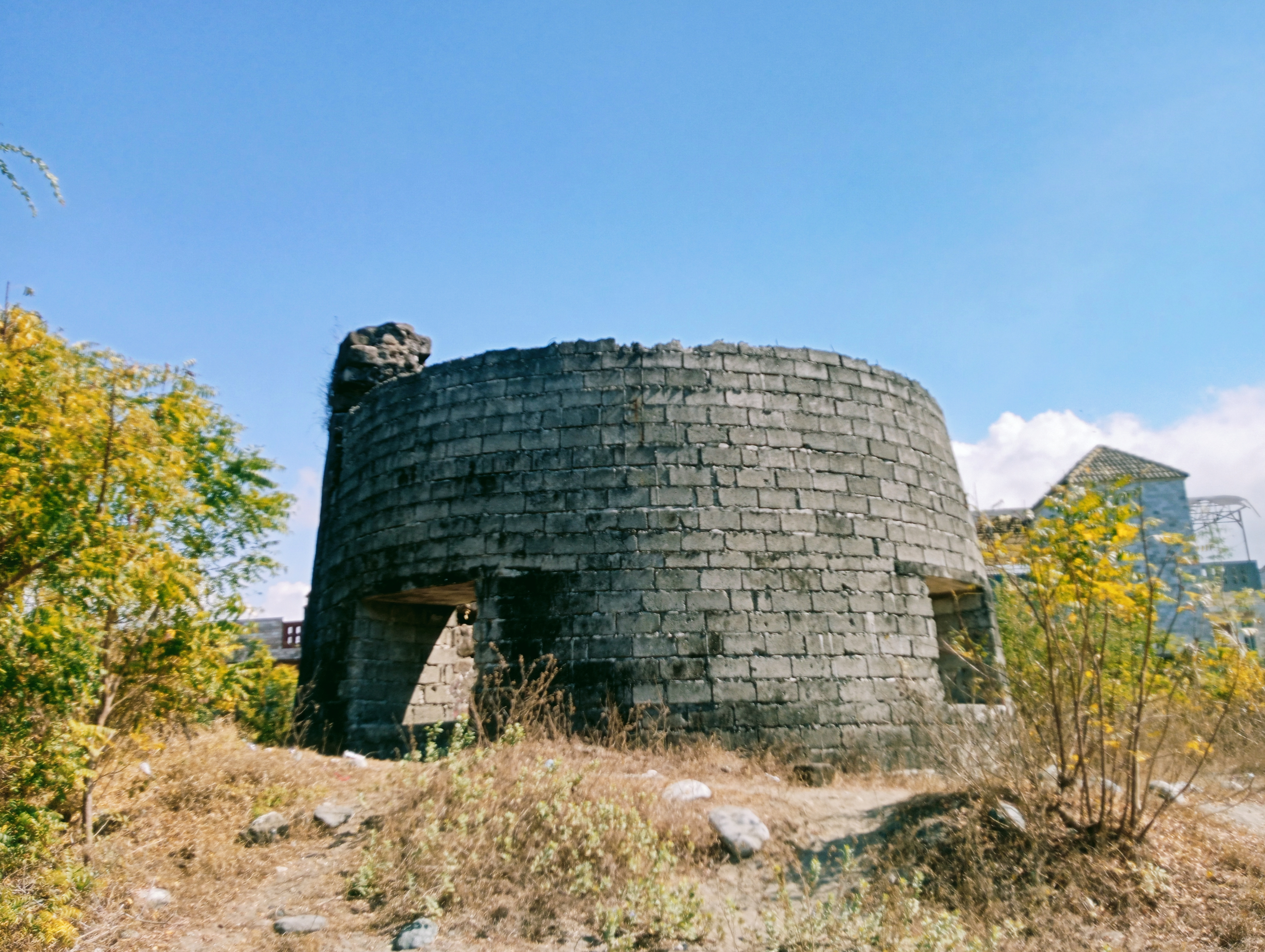
Ili Sur Watchtower, San Juan

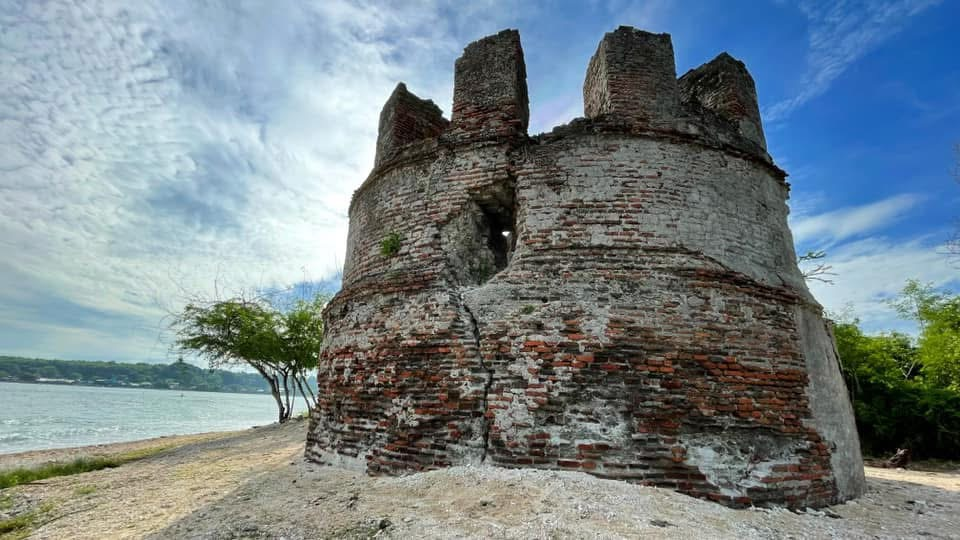
Almeida Watchtower, Balaoan

Historically, the coastal areas of the Ilocos Region were frequent targets of raids by Moro and Chinese pirates, who looted villages (barrios) and captured women and children for enslavement. These attacks led to a persistent need for defensive measures.

During the 18th and 19th centuries, conflicts between Moros and Christian Filipinos were common in the coastal areas of Northern Luzon. One notable encounter occurred on October 8, 1846, when Moro pirates landed on the northern shores of Pangasinan, specifically in Bauang, due to adverse weather conditions. The local gobernadorcillo (town mayor) organized a defense, resulting in a bloody clash in which the Christians killed four Moros, captured 29 prisoners, and seized a warship armed with four cannons. However, the attackers managed to free six Christian captives. This event illustrated the determined and defensive spirit of the Pangasinenses and Ilocanos in protecting their communities. However, the number of Moro seamen involved in the attack remains unclear in historical accounts.

Oral traditions in coastal towns such as Bauang, San Fernando, Bacnotan, San Juan, Balaoan, and Namacpacan (now Luna) recount that the Moros were referred to as "Tirongs" (raiders, attackers, or pirates). The 6- to 7-meter-high circular adobe watchtowers (baluartes), constructed mainly from coral blocks and held together by lime and egg whites, stand as historical monuments to the vigilance of these communities against potential attacks. These fortifications dot the coastline of Luna, Balaoan, San Fernando, and Bauang, serving as enduring symbols of the local people's defense against piracy.

In Namacpacan, a gobernadorcillo recorded in his diary the “maikaddua nga iyaay daguiti tirong” (second arrival of the marauders). Furthermore, a secret report from Spanish civil servant Sinibaldo de Mas in 1842 noted that, on September 8, 1841, the Namacpacan gobernadorcillo sent a dispatch to Governor-General Marcelino de Oraa Lecumberri, reporting the sighting of "eight Moro pancos with six launches" and, the following day, "another fleet of 17 pancos and 5 launches." In response, the Governor-General ordered all neighboring provinces to remain on alert, as the Moro fleet had passed through Pangasinan, Ilocos Sur, Ilocos Norte, and Cagayan.

On July 31, 1870, the Namacpacan gobernadorcillo reported to Governor-General Carlos María dela Torre that "two bands of Moros were seen toward Bangar." Several days earlier, the alcalde mayor of Pangasinan also reported sightings of Moro bands. In response to these threats, precautionary measures were implemented in La Union and Pangasinan to guard against surprise attacks.

The formation of La Union as a province in 1850 was part of broader administrative changes in the Ilocos Region. From the 16th to the 19th centuries, the original Ylocos province was divided. In 1818, the region was partitioned into Ilocos Norte and Ilocos Sur, and in 1846, the province of Abra was created. La Union was formed by combining the southernmost part of Ilocos Sur, the northern portion of Pangasinan, and the western area of Benguet.

Maps from 1832, created by Augustinian friar Manuel Blanco, indicated the existence of established pueblos in the region, with populations steadily growing. By 1838, the combined population of 12 towns was estimated at 51,163 inhabitants, and by 1848, this figure had risen to 61,472. These figures excluded the Igorots, the indigenous mountain peoples.

During the American colonial period and the Japanese occupation in World War II, the watchtowers of La Union were repurposed as military installations for monitoring potential threats along the coastline, such as enemy ships or aircraft. These structures played a crucial role in maintaining maritime security and order in the region.

After over 400 years, many of the baluartes have fallen into disuse and decay, with several in a state of neglect. The once-imposing fortifications, which once stood as critical defenses against invaders, now serve as historical remnants. For instance, the watchtower in Bauang no longer exists, having been demolished due to commercial development in the area. Despite their deterioration, these watchtowers remain symbols of the region's resilience and its people's longstanding efforts to protect their communities from external threats.

== List ==
Name	Municipality	NMP marked	Coordinates	Notes
Almeida Watchtower	Balaoan	Yes	16°49′06.5″N 120°19′49.2″E	
Bacnotan Watchtower	Bacnotan	No	P8FV+WH3	situated inside private property
Baluarte Watchtower	Luna	Yes	16°51′24.3″N 120°22′22.3″E	
Bauang Watchtower	Bauang		16.526682405392485, 120.31446516989551	ruins
Carlatan Watchtower	San Fernando	No	16°37′57.6″N 120°18′39.8″E	situated inside private property
Ili Sur Watchtower	San Juan	No	16°40′17.6″N 120°20′01.0″E	Damaged
