= Culion Museum and Archives =

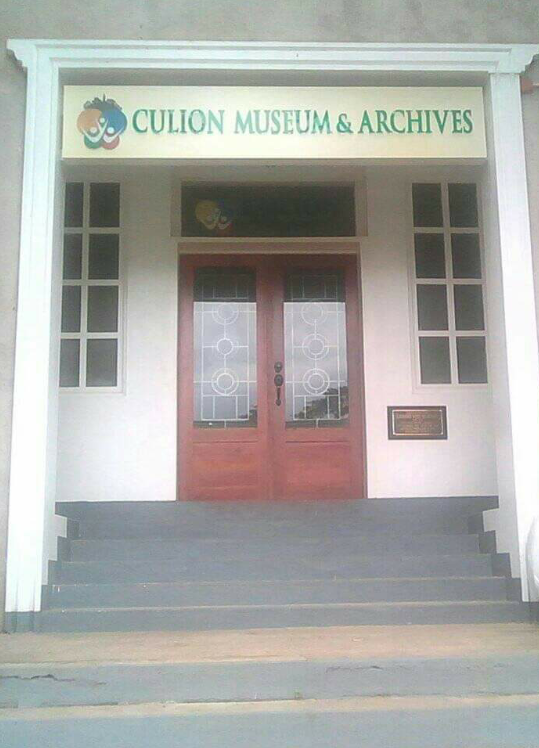
- Established: 1997
- Location: Culion Sanitarium and General Hospital, Barangay Tiza, Culion, Palawan, Philippines
- Coordinates: 11.891414412320344°N 120.02313150710756°E
- Type: Medical museum and archive

The Culion Museum and Archives is a museum in Culion, Palawan, Philippines. It is located within the Culion Sanitarium and General Hospital compound.

== History ==
The Culion Museum and Archives is housed inside the former laboratory building of the Culion leper colony. The structure was built in 1930 by the Leonard Wood Memorial and was used for research for the eradication of leprosy. In 2006, the World Health Organization declared the town leprosy-free.

The Culion Museum itself was established in 1997. It was damaged by Typhoon Haiyan (Yolanda) in November 2013, but was re-opened on July 26, 2014.

The Culion Museum was included in UNESCO Memory of the World Register – Asia and the Pacific's (MOWCAP) Regional Register on May 30, 2018.

The museum was re-opened in November 2019.

In 2024, the Culion Museum was declared a National Cultural Treasure.

== Collection ==
The collection of the Culion Museum and Archives features as a repository featuring the history, heritage, and culture of the town of Culion. It also features the experiences of the patient/residents, coming from various parts of the world, of the former Culion leper colony. Among its artifacts some dating back to 1906, are medical journals, photographs, correspondence and currency used by the lepers of Culion.
