= Rafael Izquierdo y Gutiérrez =

Spanish Military Officer, politician, and statesman

Rafael de Izquierdo y Gutiérrez
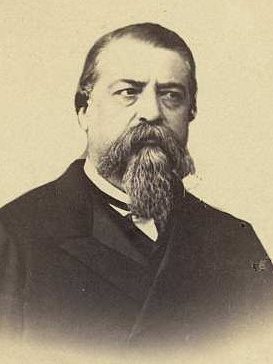

83rd Governor-General of the Philippines
- In office 4 April 1871 – 8 January 1873
- Monarch: Amadeo I
- Prime Minister: Francisco Serrano; Manuel Ruiz Zorrilla; José Malcampo; Práxedes Mateo Sagasta
- Minister of Overseas: Adelardo López de Ayala; Tomás Mosquera; Víctor Balaguer; Juan Bautista Topete; Cristóbal Martín de Herrera; Eduardo Gasset y Artime
- Preceded by: Carlos María de la Torre y Navacerrada
- Succeeded by: Manuel MacCrohon (acting)

113th Governor of Puerto Rico
- Acting
- In office 17 February – 29 April 1862
- Monarch: Isabella II
- Prime Minister: Leopoldo O'Donnell
- Minister of Overseas: Leopoldo O'Donnell
- Preceded by: Rafaél de Echagüe y Bermingham
- Succeeded by: Félix María de Messina Iglesias

101st Captain General of Catalonia
- In office 19 January – 13 March 1874
- President of the Executive Power: Francisco Serrano
- Prime Minister: Juan de Zavala
- Minister of War: Juan de Zavala
- Preceded by: Arsenio Martínez-Campos
- Succeeded by: Francisco Serrano Bedoya

Personal details
- Born: Rafael Gerónimo Cayetano de Izquierdo y Gutiérrez; 30 September 1820 (Note: One source states September 24, 1820 as his date of birth.) Santander, Spanish Empire
- Died: 9 November 1883 (aged 63) Madrid, Spanish Empire

Rafael Gerónimo Cayetano de Izquierdo y Gutiérrez (30 September 1820 – 9 November 1883) was a Spanish military officer, politician, and statesman. He served as Governor-General of the Philippines from 4 April 1871 to 8 January 1873. He was famous for his use of "Iron Fist" type of government, contradicting the liberal government of his predecessor, Carlos María de la Torre y Navacerrada. He was the governor-general during the 1872 Cavite mutiny which led to execution of 41 of the mutineers, including the Gomburza priests. Izquierdo also acted as Governor of Puerto Rico from February to April 1862.

== Early life ==
Izquierdo was born on 30 September 1820 in Santander, Spain, to Antonio Izquierdo del Monte and Antonia Gutiérrez de la Cámara. He was baptized Rafael Gerónimo Cayetano by Isidro Sánchez on the same day.

Entering as a cadet in the regiment of infantry of Gerona, Rafael Izquierdo reached the military rank of captain by the age of 17 when he participated in the First Carlist War in Navarre. At the start of the Second Carlist War which took place in Africa, Izquierdo was already a lieutenant colonel and at the end of the war brigadier general. He was then assigned to Lugo, Spain, as military governor in 1861. The following year he was assigned as lieutenant-general to Puerto Rico before becoming an interim governor-general when Rafael Echagüe y Bermingham vacated the position. Izquierdo then went back to Spain until in 1868 when he supported the revolution in Andalusia and was tasked as deputy for Malaga and Alicante in 1869 until 1871.

== Philippine governorship ==
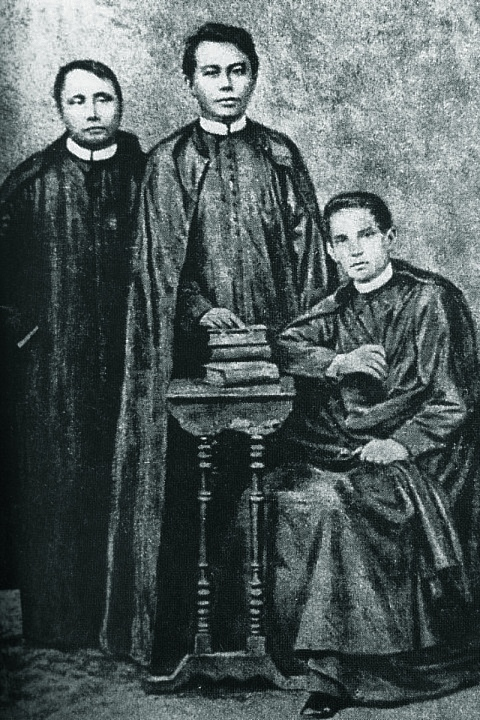
Priests Mariano Gómez, José Burgos, and Jacinto Zamora

Replacing General Carlos María de la Torre on 4 April 1871, Rafael Izquierdo was installed as Governor-General of the Philippines. He is responsible for the opening of steamship and telegraph lines in the country.

He was also known to have promptly rescinded the liberal measures, thus implementing harsher laws, which ignited an uprising. The reformation suggested that the soldiers of the Engineering and Artillery Corps should pay taxes, from which they were previously exempt. Another drastic change was the requirement to perform manual labor. These changes eventually led to the 1872 Cavite mutiny, in which around 200 soldiers of the Engineering and Artillery Corps revolted and killed their officers. In retaliation, many liberals were implicated in the involvement of the conspiracy. The Spanish military court condemned the martyred priests, Fathers Mariano Gomez, José Burgos, and Jacinto Zamora (GOMBURZA), to capital punishment by means of the garrote, on 17 February 1872. This uprising led to delays in rebuilding Malacañan Palace, and in turn almost transferred colonial governance back within the walls of Intramuros for security purposes. The plan to transfer the colonial government to Intramuros ended when Izquierdo fell ill and he stepped down from his position on 8 January 1873.

Rafael Izquierdo spent the remaining years of his life in Madrid, Spain, where he died in 1882.

== Cultural references ==
- The Filipino novel Revolution: 80 Days (2022) featured Izquierdo as an antagonist to one of its main characters Juan Ruiz, a former soldier turned migrant worker.

== See also ==
- Philippine revolts against Spain
- 1872 Cavite mutiny
- History of the Philippines (1521–1898)
- Freedom of religion in the Philippines

== Notes ==
Government offices
Preceded by Carlos María de la Torre	Governor-General of the Philippines; 4 April 1871 – 8 January 1873	Succeeded by Manuel MacCrohon
Preceded by Rafael Echagüe y Bermingham	Acting Governor of Puerto Rico; March 1862 – April 1862	Succeeded by Félix María de Messina e Iglesias
