= Ayusan–Paoa Bridge =

Historic bridge in Ilocos Sur, Philippines

- Coordinates: 17°34′1.94″N 120°22′41.55″E
- Official name: Ayusan–Paoa Spanish-Era Bridge

Characteristics
- Material: Mudbrick, Lime and egg mixture

History
- Opened: 1842

Location
- Interactive map of Ayusan–Paoa Bridge

The Ayusan–Paoa Bridge is a Spanish colonial era arch bridge in Vigan, Philippines, estimated to be constructed around 1842. It is made of mud bricks, and a mixture of lime and eggs as mortar. The Department of Public Works and Highways (DPWH) proposed the demolition of the bridge in 2015 and the construction of a new bridge in lieu of it. Such plan was opposed by various local groups and the proposed bridge was built beside the old bridge instead. It is recognized as a National Cultural Treasure in 2016.
