= Filipino Struggles Through History =

1964 painting by Botong Francisco

- History of Manila
- Portion of the artwork depicting the Katipunan of the Philippine Revolution.
- Artist: Botong Francisco
- Year: 1964
- Medium: Oil on canvas
- Movement: Cubism
- Subject: History of the Philippines
- Dimensions: 2.7 m × 79.4 m (110 in × 3,130 in)
- Location: National Museum of Fine Arts, Manila
- Owner: City of Manila

The Filipino Struggles Through History is an artwork by Filipino artist Botong Francisco. The artwork is a declared National Cultural Treasure.

== History ==
Filipino Struggles Through History was a commissioned for the Manila City Government in 1964 during the mayoral tenure of Antonio Villegas. and was installed at the Bulwagang Katipunan (later renamed Bulwagang Gat Antonio Villegas) of the Manila City Hall in 1968. On April 8, 1996, the artwork was declared a National Cultural Treasure by then National Museum director Gabriel S. Casal.

The artwork sustained damages caused by plumbing issues at the Manila City Hall. Then-Manila Mayor Alfredo Lim requested for the artwork to be restored with assistance from the National Museum and funding from the Tourism Infrastructure and Enterprise Zone Authority. The artwork was removed in 2013 for restoration work which was finished in 2015 and was transferred inside the National Museum of Fine Arts in Manila for public exhibition in February 2018. In 2017, then-Mayor Joseph Estrada decided to allow the National Museum to keep custody of the artwork in return of the museum organization providing a replica of the artwork.

In 2019, following the inauguration of Isko Moreno as Mayor of Manila, former mayor Lito Atienza urged for the return of the artwork to the Manila City Hall. In its original place, the artwork was replaced by a tarpaulin replica.

== Artwork ==
Filipino Struggles Through History, alternatively known as the History of Manila is a series paintings which depicts select events from Philippine history. It composes of 10 canvas panels collectively measuring 2.7 meters (8.9 ft) high and 79.4 meters (260 ft) wide.

Seven of the panels exhibited at the Old Senate Session Hall at the National Museum of Fine Arts portrays the history of Manila: From the historical Tondo period to the end of the American colonial era in 1946. The last three panels, exhibited at the within the same museum's Vicente and Carmen Fabella Hall, depicts then-Mayor Antonio Villegas' vision for the city of Manila.
