= Real Alcaicería de San Fernando =

Former market in Manila, Philippines

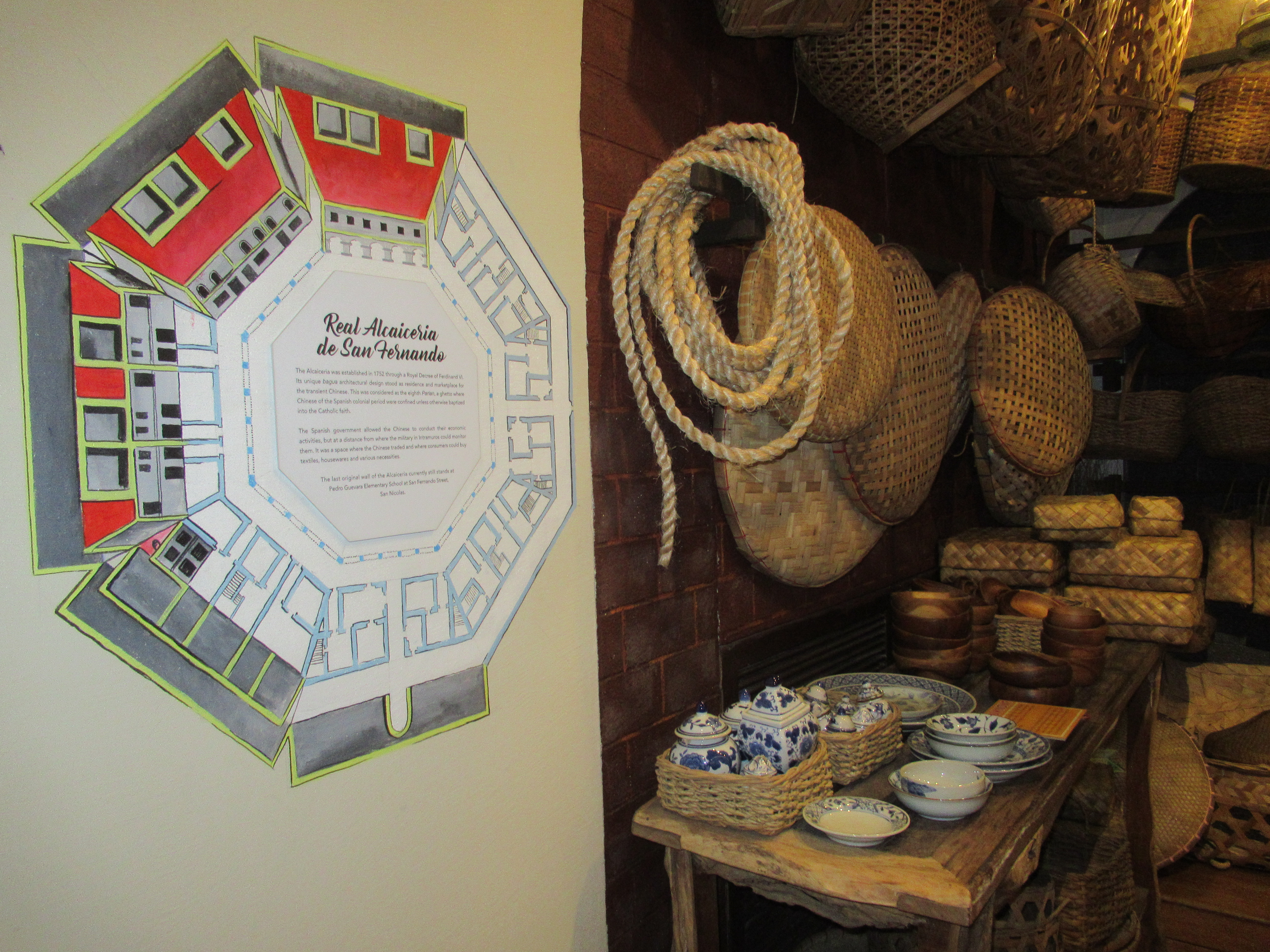

The Real Alcaicería de San Fernando ("Royal Marketplace of San Fernando") was a marketplace and custom house constructed after a royal decree by King Ferdinand VI in 1752. The mandate intended the space to be a residential and commercial zone for the transient Chinese merchants to conduct their business. It was located on Calle San Fernando (today San Fernando Street), San Nicolas, Manila, Philippines.

== Background on the Manila parians ==
A parián or parián de los sangleys was a space built for non-Christian Chinese to reside in. They were segregated to live in ghettos away from the native Filipinos as a way for the Spanish authorities to better monitor and restrict their activities. The first parián in Manila was built in 1581 and was located within the walls of Intramuros. It was made of light materials and fire wrecked it two years later. Along with the complaints of Spanish residents who were repulsed by the Chinese, Governor General Diego Ronquillo moved the parián to the border of Intramuros. Between 1581 and 1860, there were nine parians in Manila, always near the mouth of the Pasig River. Other locations for the other parianes include the locations of the modern-day Arroceros Forest Park and Manila Central Post Office. The Alcaicería is considered to be the second-to-last parián in Manila.

Parians were not only found in Manila but were present in major port cities where Chinese merchants clustered in. Some examples include Cebu and Iloilo in the Visayan Islands, and Davao and Sulu in Mindanao.

== The Alcaicería in San Fernando ==
Although an expulsion decree in 1755 deported most of the non-Christianized Chinese in Manila, the Chinese merchants were allowed back into the colony in 1758 because of the necessity of their economic contributions. By this time, the Real Alcaicería de San Fernando was operational and became the designated residence for the merchants, who could pay a fee for licenses that will allow them to trade inside. What in part made trading in Manila so attractive to Chinese merchants was the opportunity to participate in the Manila–Acapulco galleon trade where many Chinese goods were prized. The Alcaiceria quickly became a busy space that the Chinese traded and where consumers could buy textiles (e.g., silk, muslin), porcelain, furniture and various goods.

Up until the mid-eighteenth century, there was no formal custom house (aduana) in Manila. The first aduana was housed in the Alcaicería de San Fernando, which later contributed to the city's significance as a commercial capital.

== Location, design and construction ==
Previously, most parians in Manila were located on the southern bank of the Pasig River, close to Intramuros. The transfer of the aduana near the wharf of Binondo allowed Spanish authorities to better monitor the merchants’ activities at a distance. The Alcaiceria has two entrances: one facing the Pasig River and the other facing Calle San Fernando. Chinese junks entering the city for trade were made to dock in front of the Alcaicería and in the case of military unrest, the Alcaicería was strategically within range of canons belonging to the Spanish military.

The design of the structure is credited to a Recollect friar named Lucas de Jesús María, who was speculated to be influenced by Chinese culture. The octagonal shape is reminiscent of a bagua. The construction expenses were subsidized by Fernando de Mier y Noriega in compensation for the title of "alcalde" of the structure.

== Remains ==
After the fire of 1850, the structure fell into disuse. Currently, the site is occupied by Pedro Guevarra Elementary School (formerly named San Nicolas Elementary School when it was first established), a large public school complex in the San Nicolas district where some of its walls still remain.

Another piece of the structure that remained was the Alcaicería de San Fernando marker dating back to 1762, the year of the Alcaicería's completion and the policies its administration. The marker is in the possession of the National Museum which declared it to be a National Treasure because of its "exceptional cultural, artistic and/or historical significance" as indicated on the Philippine Official Gazette. A reproduction of the marker can be seen in Chinatown Museum, located in Reina Regente street.
