= Carlos María de la Torre y Navacerrada =

Spanish soldier and politician

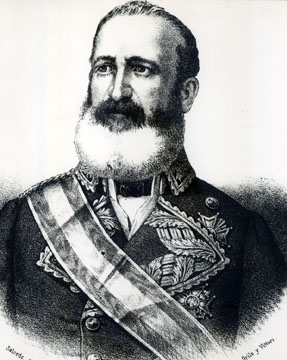

82nd Governor-General of the Philippines
- In office 23 June 1869 – 4 April 1871
- Monarch: Amadeo I
- Preceded by: Manuel Maldonado (acting)
- Succeeded by: Rafael Izquierdo y Gutiérrez

Personal details
- Born: 27 February 1809 Seville, Spanish Empire
- Died: 2 December 1879 (aged 70) Madrid, Spanish Empire

Carlos María de la Torre y Navacerrada (27 February 1809 – 2 December 1879) was a Spanish soldier and politician. He served as the governor-general of the Philippines from 1869 to 1871, and is considered one of the most beloved Spanish governors-general assigned to the Philippines.

== Biography ==
A Carlist army officer, he was sent from Spain by Francisco Serrano after the ouster of Queen Isabel II as a result of the La Gloriosa revolution. He was considered a liberal Spaniard who practiced the liberal and democratic principles for imposing liberal laws. He wanted to have the bronze statue of Isabel II, first unveiled in 1860, melted so that it would be put to better use. However, the Manila City Council saved it by declaring the statue municipal property.

He established the Guardia Civil in the Philippines and gave amnesty to rebels, of which the most prominent was Casimiro Camerino (El tulisán), the leader of bandits in Cavite. He organized the bandits given amnesty into an auxiliary force of the Guardia Civil. He abolished flogging, relaxed media censorship, and began limited secularization of education. He was also very close to the ilustrados, a group of Filipinos who understood the situation of the Philippines under Spanish rule. His supporters had done a liberal parade in front of the Malacañan Palace.

Only two weeks after the arrival of de la Torre as governor-general, Burgos and Joaquín Pardo de Tavera led a demonstration at the Plaza de Santa Potenciana. Among the demonstrators were José Icaza, Jácobo Zobel, Ignacio Rocha, Manuel Genato, and Máximo Paterno. The cry was "Viva Filipinas para los Filipinos!". In November 1870, a student movement, denounced as a riot or motín, at the University of Santo Tomas formed a committee to demand reforms on the school and its curricula. It later announced support of Philippine autonomy and recognition of the Philippines as a province of Spain. The committee was headed by Felipe Buencamino.

De la Torre was single and he had a mistress who had great influence on him. His mistress, Maria del Rosario Gil de Montes de Sanchiz, flared up friar opposition because of many reasons. One of the reasons was she authored a book entitled El Hombre de Dios. It was criticized because a woman wrote it.

Another is during a festivity in Malacañang Palace that was mainly attended by Philippine creoles, who are now definitely called Filipinos. She arrived at the place wearing a ribbon which said Viva la Libertad (English: Long live liberty) and Viva el Pueblo Soberano (English: Long live the sovereign nation).

In March 1872, de la Torre wrote to Madrid concerning his decision to get relieved from his post. However, his patron in Spain was assassinated the previous month and orders for his relief was given nine days before his letter was written. He was succeeded by Governor-General Rafael de Izquierdo, who was described as the opposite of his liberal-mindedness.

Government offices
Preceded by Manuel Maldonado; Acting	Governor-General of the Philippines; 23 June 1869 – 4 April 1871	Succeeded by Rafael de Izquierdo
