= Culion Sanitarium and General Hospital =

Government hospital in Palawan, Philippines

Geography
- Location: Tiza, Culion, Palawan, Mimaropa, Philippines
- Coordinates: 11°53′29″N 120°01′25″E

Services
- Beds: 200

History
- Founded: November 13, 2009; 16 years ago (formally as a general hospital; supplanted the Culion leper colony); 1994; 32 years ago (de facto general hospital)

Links
- Website: csgh.com.ph

The Culion Sanitarium and General Hospital (CSGH) is a government hospital in the Philippines. It is located in Culion, Palawan and is the only general hospital in the Calamian Islands. It also serves patients in the rest of Northern Palawan.

== History ==
The Culion Sanitarium and General Hospital traces its history to the Culion leper colony which admitted its first leprosy patients in May 27, 1906. The Culion settlement was noted to be the largest leper colony in the Far East.

Formerly the Culion Sanitarium, the facility began providing general health services in 1994. However its function as a general hospital was only formalized in November 13, 2009 via Republic Act No. 9790 and adopted its current name. While the history of CSGH dates a century back, the hospital considers 2009 as its establishment date. In 2014, a marker showing the facility's new name was unveiled by the National Historical Commission of the Philippines.

In September 2024, the CSGH opened its dialysis center, the first fully government-funded facility of its kind in Northern Palawan.
