= Archaeology of Pinagbayanan =

Pinagbayanan is a barrio in the municipality of Pila, Laguna, Philippines. The 2010 census estimates its population at 5,305 people. Archaeological excavations in the area have contributed to developments in the field of ceramics and led to the recognition of the importance of the area to archaeology.

== Background ==
Archaeological excavations in the area have contributed to the developments in the field of ceramics and led to the recognition of the importance of the Laguna de Bay area to archaeology. H. Otley Beyer pointed out the archaeological potential of the areas around Laguna de Bay due to its strategic location. It was among the most important centers of trade and culture during the period in the history of the Philippines that Beyer called the Porcelain Age, during which trade with China—under the Sung and Yuan dynasties—flourished, as evidenced by trade ceramics dated from the same period.

Pinagbayanan site, Pila, Laguna

== Excavations ==
Despite the number of porcelain sites in the area, only a few had been systematically excavated until the 1960s. In 1967, archaeological excavations were conducted by Julita Fernandez, Amelia Rogel, Dr. Robert Bradford Fox and Avelino Legaspi around the Laguna de Bay area. 153 graves were found, dated from 12th to 15th CE.

=== Locsin Excavations ===
Leandro and Cecilia Locsin and a team of archaeologists from the University of San Carlos, headed by Rosa C.P. Tenazas, partially excavated three sites in Pinagbayanan from 1967 to 1968. A typhoon helped in recovering additional information by uncovering burial locations. The dearth of skeletal remains made the identification of burials difficult. Of the 190 burials discovered, only 20 contained traces of skeletal remains. With the exception of one Ming burial which was the most well-preserved and contained ten pieces of pottery, none of the other burials were associated with grave goods.

==== Discoveries ====
The discoveries in the Locsin and the University of San Carlos excavation of Pinagbayanan are divided into several archaeological horizons dated from 1100 CE to 1400 CE. The first horizon is associated with the Iron Age, before trade contacts were established with China or Arabia and contained earthenware used for burials. The second horizon is associated with the Sung period. The depth of the stratigraphic layer indicates long periods without cultural change. The site was mainly used for burials. The third horizon is associated with the Yuan period. The presence of horse bones shows that horses had come earlier than the Spaniards. The sites were used for habitation and burials. A crematory complex was also discovered. The stone structure contained phosphate deposits, bamboo charcoal and other evidence of burning.

Phallic earthenwares were found in the Pinagbayanan sites which suggest the possibility that they were used as a symbol of fertility. A net sinker that might have been intended to be a yonic symbol was also discovered.
