= Relief Map of Mindanao =

1892 landscaping by José Rizal

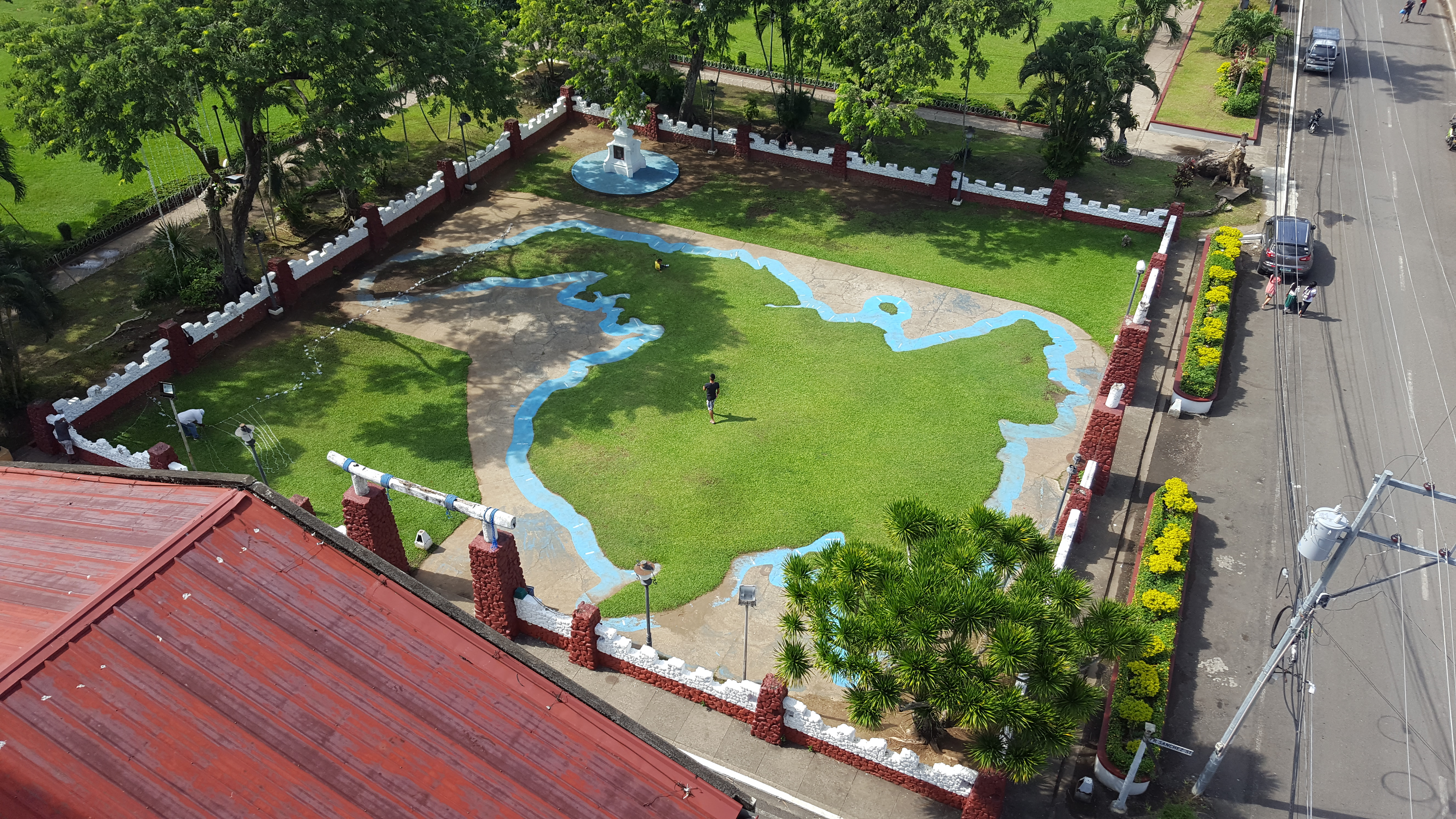
- Artist: Jose Rizal
- Completion date: 1892
- Subject: Geography of Mindanao
- Designation: National Cultural Treasure
- Location: Dapitan Heritage Zone, Dapitan; 8°39′17″N 123°25′29″E

National Cultural Treasures
- Official name: Relief Map of Mindanao
- Designated: May 24, 2011; 15 years ago
- Region: Zamboanga Peninsula
- Legal basis: Resolution No. 3
- Marker date: June 20, 2005; 21 years ago

The Relief Map of Mindanao in Dapitan, Philippines, is a landscaping work by Jose Rizal. It is situated near the St. James the Greater Church.

It is recognized by the National Historical Commission of the Philippines as a National Cultural Treasure
