= Kawayan Torogan =

- Torogan sa Kawayan

General information
- Status: National Cultural Treasure
- Type: Traditional Maranao house
- Architectural style: Torogan
- Location: Bubung Malanding, Brgy. Pompongan-a-marantao, Marawi, Lanao del Sur, Philippines

Technical details
- Material: Wood
- Floor count: One

The Kawayan Torogan (also Torogan sa Kawayan) is a traditional Maranao torogan (house) built by Sultan sa Kawayan Makaantal in Bubung Malanding, Marantao, Lanao del Sur. Being the last standing example of the house of the elite members of the Maranao tribe, and the only remaining habitable torogan, it was declared as a National Cultural Treasure by the National Museum of the Philippines in 2008. The location of the structure is in Marawi City according to a 2008 declaration. However, according to a 2015 declaration, the structure's location was in Marantao. The recently updated 2018 PRECUP currently states that the Kawayan Torogan is in Pompongan-a-marantao, a barangay (village) of Marawi City, not of Marantao town. The confusion has caused scholars to push for the declaration of the kawayan torogan in Marantao as a National Cultural Treasure, as well. The National Commission for Culture and the Arts has no official statement regarding the issue yet.

== Features of the Torogan ==
A torogan, which literally translates as "a place for sleeping”, is the stately house of elite members of the Maranao tribe in the province of Lanao del Sur in the island of Mindanao, Philippines. As the house of the datu or sultan, it is a symbol of status and leadership. It is known for its traditional vernacular architecture, the pre-Islamic style tracing to Indian architectural influence; and has been called "the prime example of the architectural genius of Filipinos". This style of great-house has a single large hall with no permanent partitions and is divided only into sleeping areas under a widely flaring, ridged roof. Its dominant feature is the unique floor end beams, known as panolongs, which have butterfly-shaped projections and are carved alternately with the traditional Maranao symbols of niaga or naga (serpent or dragon) and pako rabong armalis (asymmetrical growing fern). Unique designs through carvings and paintings are also found on the house's facade panels and interior posts. It is built above the ground using massive tree trunks on rounded boulders as a measure against earthquake, wood rot and infestation of termites. It also includes the gibon or paga known as the room of the datu's daughter; the bilik, a hiding place at the back of the sultan’s headboard. Entrance is usually located near the datu's bed.

Torogan also serves as a courthouse and hall for community meetings and its courtyard as ritual areas for weddings and coronations. It also embodies the height of the okir decorative tradition.

== Declaration as a National Cultural Treasure ==
Under Presidential Decree No. 374, which amends certain sections of Republic Act no. 4846 or "The Cultural Properties Preservation and Protection Act", the National Museum is one of the lead agencies tasked to declare National Cultural Treasures. The declaration for the Kawayan Torogan was made through Museum Declaration no. 4 in 2008.

The specifically declared torogan known as the Kawayan torogan is the last standing example of traditional Maranao vernacular architecture in the Philippines and the only remaining habitable torogan there.

== Current state ==
Unfortunately, the Kawayan torogan needs immediate rehabilitation. Some parts of the house were reported to be collapsed. In an architectural documentation of the National Commission for Culture and the Arts, the complete rehabilitation would need the government to allocate ₱ 2.5 million. Aside from the Kawayan torogan, many other torogans in Lanao are in the same condition, prompting conservationists to campaign for their restoration.
