= Legazpi–Urdaneta Monument =

Monument in Manila, Philippines

- Monumentong Legazpi–Urdaneta (Filipino)
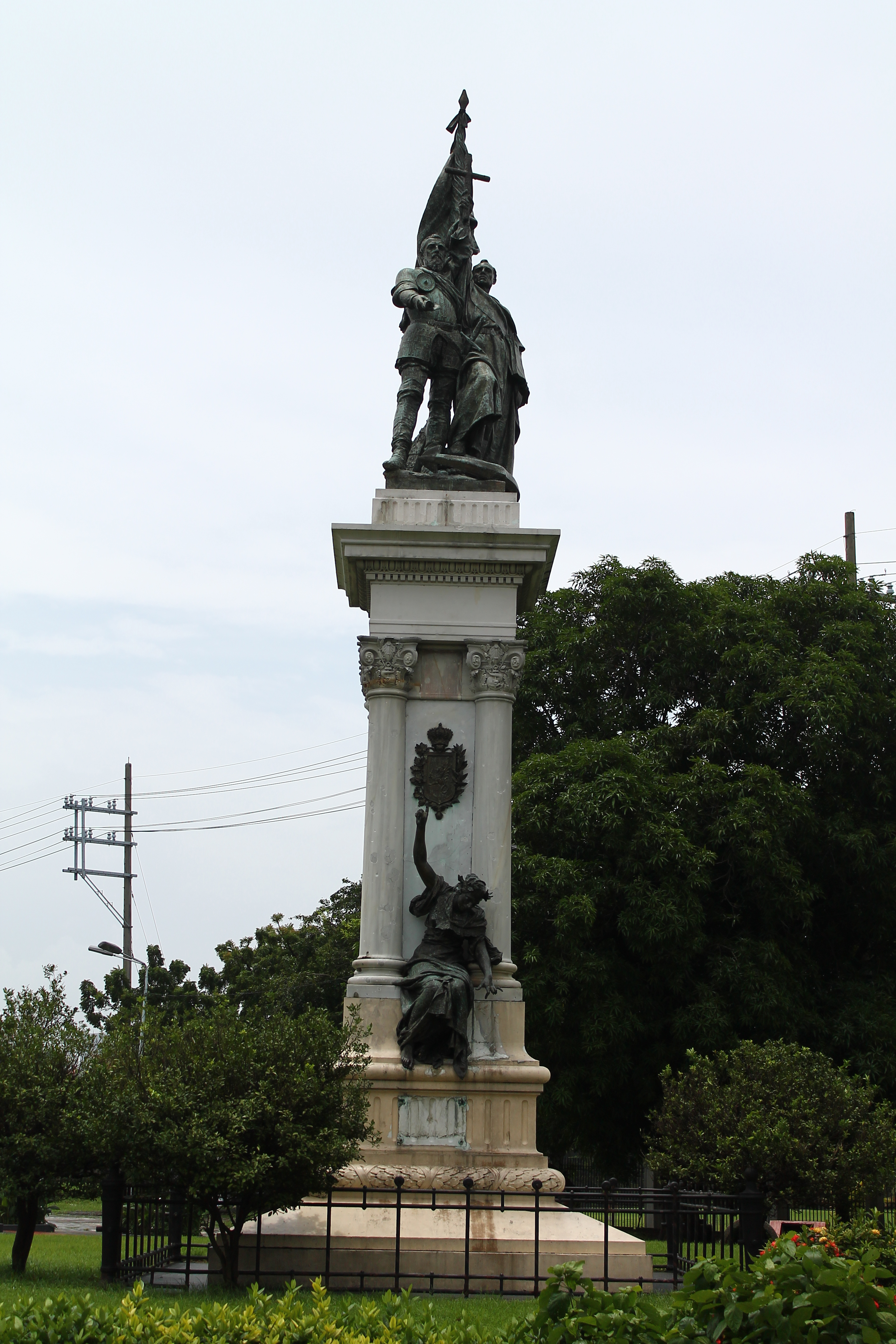
- Interactive map of Legazpi–Urdaneta Monument
- Location: Bonifacio Drive cor. Padre Burgos Ave., Intramuros, Manila, Philippines
- Coordinates: 14°35′02″N 120°58′32″E
- Designer: Architect Luis Maria Cabello
- Builder: Sculptor Agustí Querol Subirats
- Material: Marble, bronze

The Legazpi–Urdaneta Monument is a monument to Miguel López de Legazpi, Spanish conquistador and Andrés de Urdaneta, friar and maritime explorer. The monument is located along Bonifacio Drive cor. Padre Burgos Avenue, Intramuros, Manila, Philippines.

== History ==
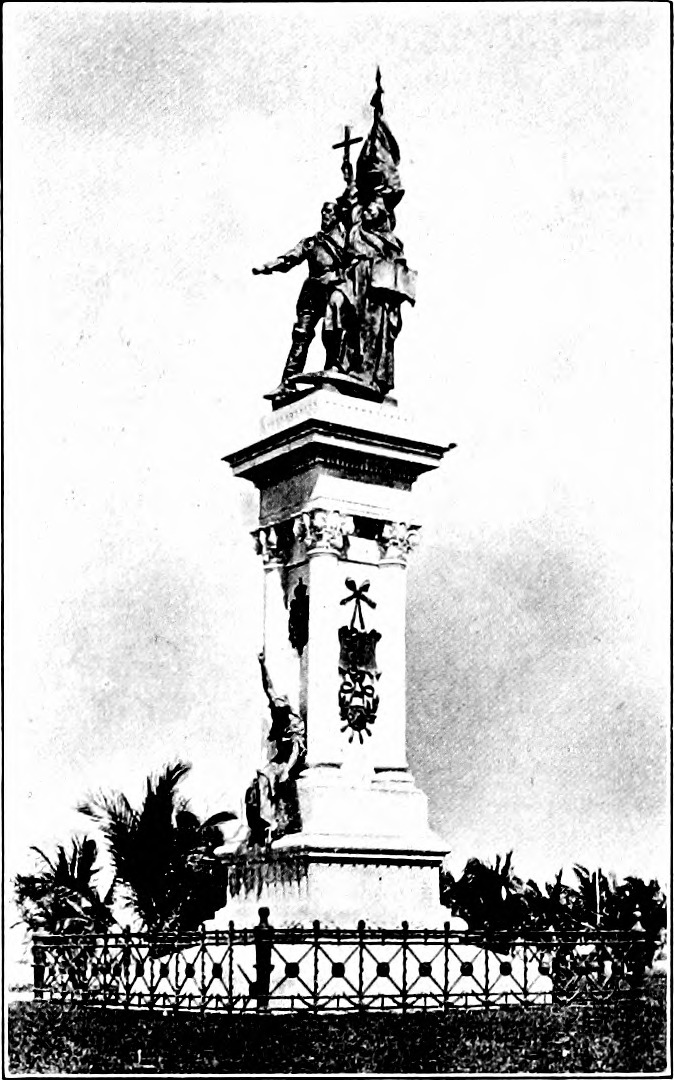
The monument c. 1907

The monument was commissioned by Señor Gutierrez Dela Vega who initiated a public subscription during the last years of the Spanish colonization of the Philippines (1890s) and was granted by Governor-General Valeriano Weyler. The monument was designed by Arch. Luis Maria Cabello. The design was executed and the bronze elements cast by Agustí Querol Subirats in Barcelona, Spain.

However, by the time of its completion, Spain no longer has control of the Philippines, which was now annexed by the United States of America. The monument arrived in the Philippines but was not installed till 1901 by the then Provost-Marshall-General Dwight F. Davis who also installed many of the monuments still in storage

The monument was virtually untouched during the fierce artillery fights and bombings of the Liberation of Manila, only incurring minor damage to its bronze, which was quickly repaired by Anastacio Caedo. However, desecration from 21st century vandals have removed some of its bronze furnishings.

The monument was declared National Cultural treasure in 2016.

== Design ==
The monument pays homage to Miguel López de Legazpi, Spanish conquistador and Andrés de Urdaneta, friar and maritime explorer, of which their bronze statues are placed on top of a marble plinth. Legazpi holds the flag on his left hand and a scroll on his right, allegorical representations of expedition, sea and valor. Urdaneta holds a cross on his right hand and a book on his left, representations of Christianity and science. On his feet is a large anchor, representing his maritime prowess.

On the front and rear of the top part of the plinth are arms of Manila and Spain. In its sides lists the names of explorers: Magallanes, Loaisa, Elcano, and Villalobos. Near the bottom of plinth is a lady in laurels holding a plate bearing the inscription XXIV Junio MDLXXI—referring to the date June 24, 1571, when Legazpi established Spanish colonial rule in Manila, turning the city into the capital of the colony. This plaque is among the most notable elements of the monument vandalized / missing since 2012.
