= Queen Isabel II Statue =

Queen Isabel II Monument
- Bantayog ni Reyna Isabel II
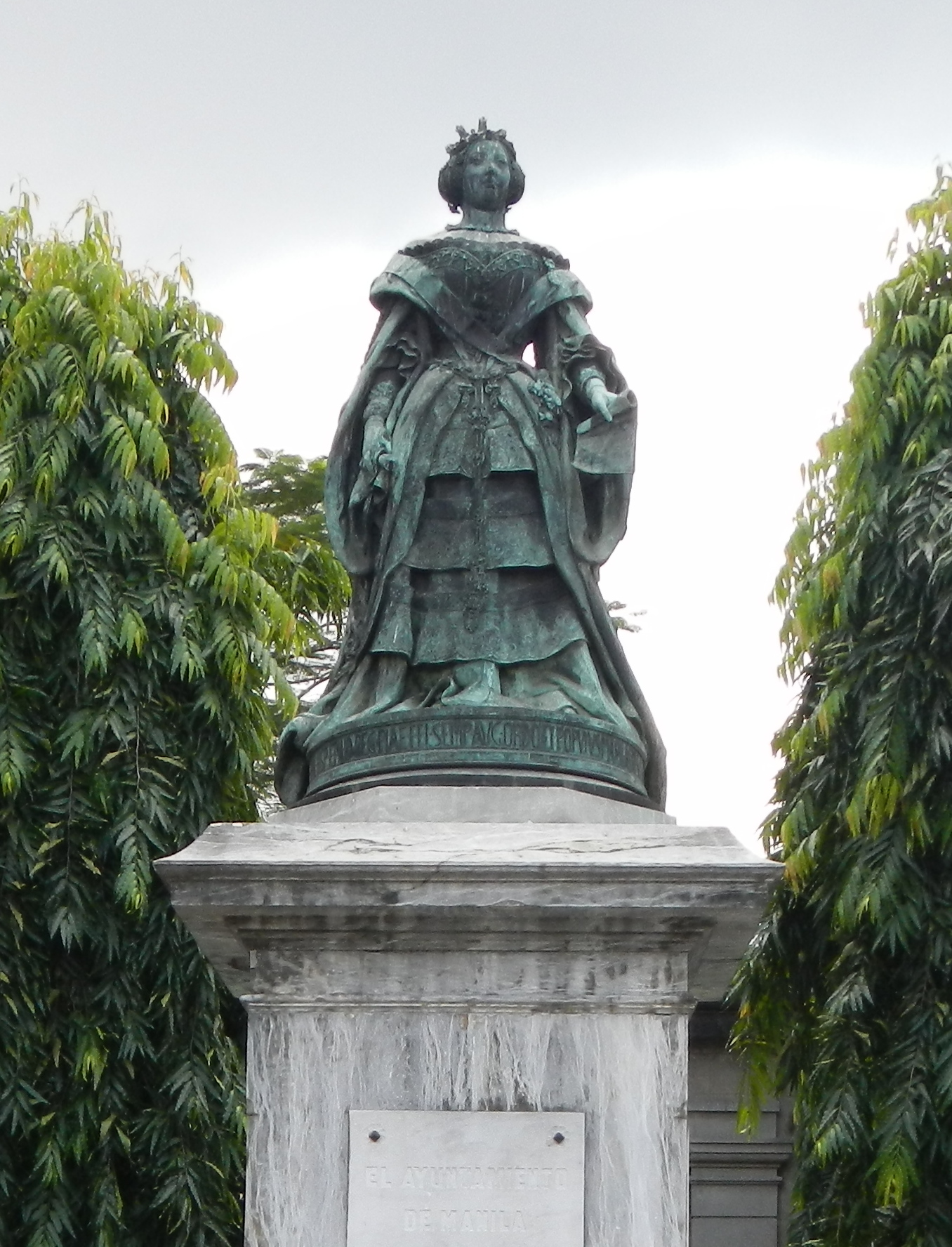
- The statue of Queen Isabel II of Spain
- Interactive map of Queen Isabel II Monument
- Location: Puerta Isabel II, Intramuros, Manila
- Designer: Ponciano Ponzano
- Type: Monument
- Material: Bronze
- Opening date: 14 July 1860
- Dedicated to: Isabel II of Spain

The Queen Isabel II Statue (Filipino: Bantayog ni Reyna Isabel II or Monumento ni Reyna Isabel II; Spanish: Monumento a la Reina Isabel II) is located in front of Puerta Isabel II in Intramuros, Manila, Philippines. It is made of bronze and was funded by donations collected from the city in 1854 and 1855. Ponciano Ponzano, a Spanish sculptor was commissioned to do the work. It was erected amidst festive ceremonies on 14 July 1860 near Teatro Alfonso XII in Arroceros in what is now Plaza Lawton (now Liwasang Bonifacio).

Political upheavals in Spain led to the downfall of the Queen Isabel II and the rise of the liberal government in 1868. One of its officials, Carlos María de la Torre, was appointed governor-general of the Philippines. It was not long before he set on removing the remnants of the old regime in Manila. The task of destroying the monument was given to Bartolome Barretto, a government official. A sympathizer of the Spanish crown, he refused to carry out the task. Chinese workers were hired to remove the statue and Barretto hid it in his house before the Ayuntamiento reclaimed it. The Sociedad Económica de los Amigos del País (Economic Association of Friends of the Country) requested that the statue be made part of their museum collection but de la Torre consigned it to a storeroom in the Casas Consistoriales.

The statue was brought out and erected in front of the Malate Church in 1896. It remained there for over half a century until in 1970 when it was blown down by Typhoon Yoling. The monument was transferred to its present site during the visit of the then Prince Juan Carlos of Spain in 1975.
