= Manila Metropolitan Theater =

Arts center in Manila, Philippines

Metropolitan Theater
- Tanghalang Metropolitan (Filipino)

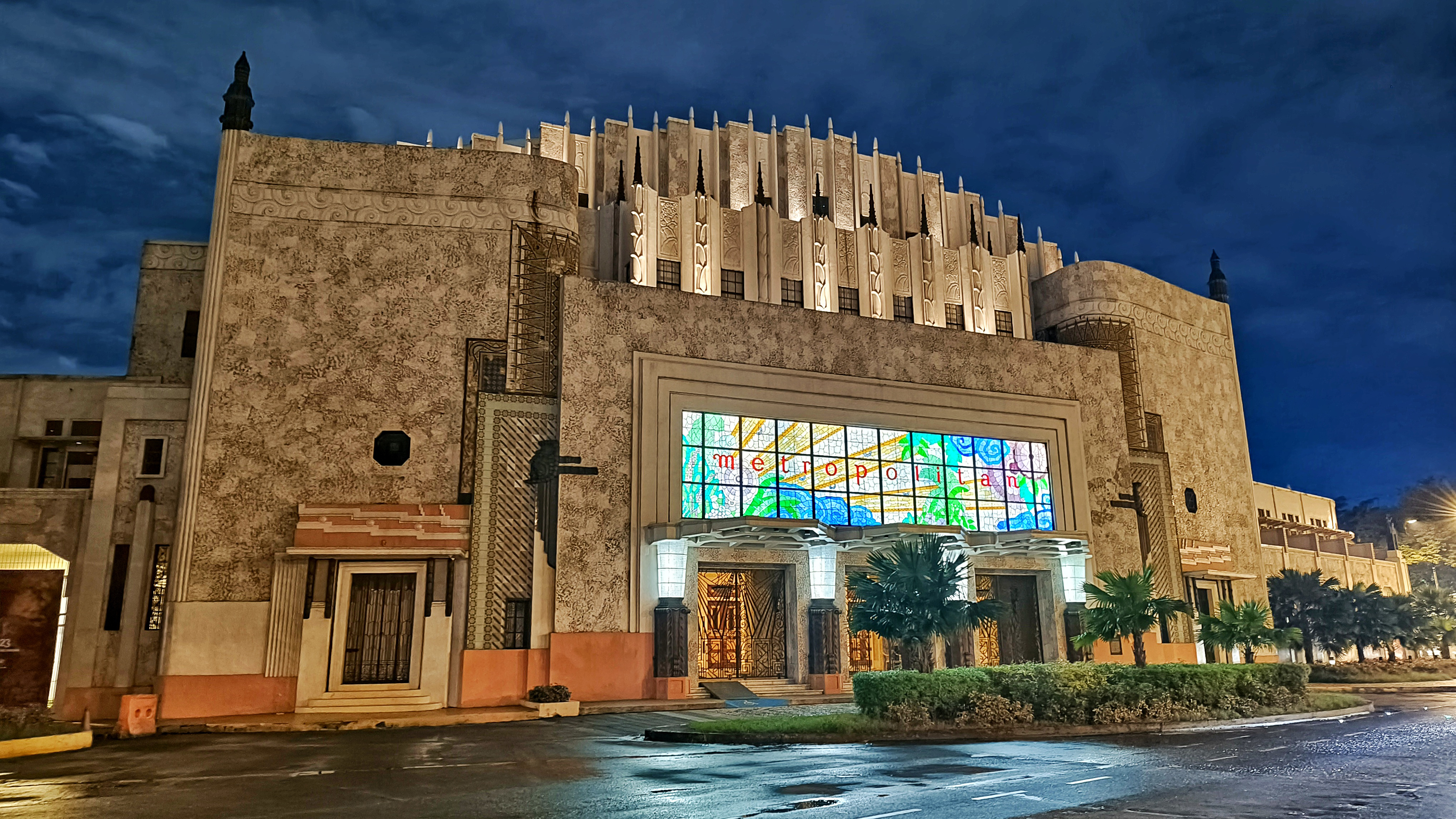
- The theater in 2024

- Location within Manila

General information
- Type: Performing arts center
- Architectural style: Art Deco
- Location: Padre Burgos Avenue cor. Arroceros Street, Ermita, Manila, Philippines
- Coordinates: 14.5940°N 120.9806°E
- Opened: December 10, 2021 (reopening)
- Inaugurated: December 10, 1931; 94 years ago
- Renovated: 1978, 2015–2021
- Owner: NCCA

Design and construction
- Architect: Juan M. Arellano

Other information
- Seating capacity: 1,600 (1931-2015); 990 (2015-present)

National Cultural Treasures
- Official name: Metropolitan Theater Historical Landmark
- Designated: June 23, 2010; 16 years ago
- Reference no.: 4–2010
- Region: National Capital Region
- Legal basis: Resolution No. 2017-330, s. 2018

National Historical Landmarks
- Official name: Manila Metropolitan Theater
- Type: Building, Theater
- Designated: October 21, 1976; 50 years ago
- Region: National Capital Region
- Legal basis: Resolution No. 4, s. 1976
- Marker Date: 1988

The Manila Metropolitan Theater (Filipino: Tanghalang Metropolitan; also known as the Metropolitan Theater; abbreviated as the MET) is a historic Philippine Art Deco building located in Plaza Lawton in Ermita, Manila. It is recognized as the forefront of the Art Deco architectural style in the Philippines.

Designed by architect Juan M. Arellano, the Metropolitan Theater was inaugurated on December 10, 1931. The theater was heavily damaged during the Battle of Manila and subsequently went through several restoration programs of varying levels of success. After its most extensive public restoration efforts, the Metropolitan Theater reopened on December 10, 2021, the 90th anniversary of its inauguration. It is currently under the administration of the National Commission for Culture and the Arts (NCCA).

In 1976, the Metropolitan Theater was declared a National Historical Landmark by the National Historical Commission of the Philippines (NHCP). In 2010, the National Museum recognized the Met as a National Cultural Treasure.

== History ==
=== Origins, opening, and pre-war years (1924–1942) ===
In 1924, during the American Colonial period, the Philippine Legislature approved the project proposal of Senator Juan B. Alegre to build a "people's theater" in the Mehan Garden. There was little, however, that came of it until 1928, when Manila Mayor Tomas Earnshaw spearheaded a project to build a theater. The City of Manila leased out 8,293 square meters of public land in the Mehan Garden to the newly-formed Metropolitan Theater Company at ₱1.00 for 99 years.

The Metropolitan Theater Company was made up of wealthy Manila businessmen who would provide the capital for the venture. It was headed by Horace B. Pond of the Pacific Commercial Company, who was joined on the Board by Antonio Melian of El Hogar Filipino, Enrique Zóbel of Ayala y Compañia, University of the Philippines President Rafael Palma, Senator Manuel Camus, Leopold Kahn of Levy Hermanos, and businessman J.L. Pierce. The Metropolitan Theater Company raised ₱1 million to fund the project through community efforts, including fundraising dinners and selling stock to the public at affordable rates, offering Class A shares for ₱100.00 and Class B shares for ₱5.00 par value.

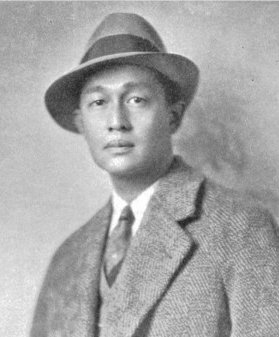
Filipino architect Juan M. Arellano departed from his neoclassical architectural style, employed in his design of the Legislative Building and Manila Post Office, by designing the Art Deco-style Metropolitan Theater.

Filipino architect Juan M. Arellano was commissioned by the government to design the theater and was sent to the United States to study under Thomas W. Lamb, one of America's leading architects in theater design. At that point, Arellano was known for his neoclassical architectural style, but the Metropolitan Theater marked his departure towards more modern designs.

The cornerstone was laid in February 1928, with construction by Pedro A. Siochi & Co. as contractors.

The Metropolitan Theater was inaugurated on December 10, 1931. In attendance were Mayor Earnshaw, Senate President Manuel L. Quezon, Interim American Governor George C. Butte, Speaker of the House Sergio Osmeña, and other prominent government leaders, businessmen, and society figures.

During the following pre-war decade, the Metropolitan Theater hosted international artists including Ted Shawn, Jascha Heifetz, Amelita Galli-Curci, and Fritz Kreisler. The theater also hosted the local dance productions of Lubov Adameit, Leonor Orosa-Goquingco, Paul Szilard, and Trudl Dubsky. Other significant events at the theater include the premier of production studio LVN Pictures's inaugural film Giliw Ko (1939).

=== World War II (1942–1945) ===
Unlike other similar establishments, during the Japanese Occupation in the Second World War, the Metropolitan Theater was still active. It became the home of the New Philippines Symphony Orchestra, conducted by Francisco Santiago, which held its inaugural concert in July 1942. Alongside concerts and film screenings, the Met was the stage for the performances of the Dramatic Philippines theater group founded by Francisco "Soc" Rodrigo and Narciso Pimentel, Jr. from 1943 to 1944. They performed Rodrigo's translations and adaptations of Western plays.

The Japanese authorities utilized the Metropolitan Theater for various cultural and political activities during their occupation. On October 17 and 20, 1943, two Independence Symphony Concerts were held at the Met to celebrate Japan's declaration of the Philippines as an independent republic under President Jose P. Laurel. The KALIBAPI political party also used the building as a meeting center.

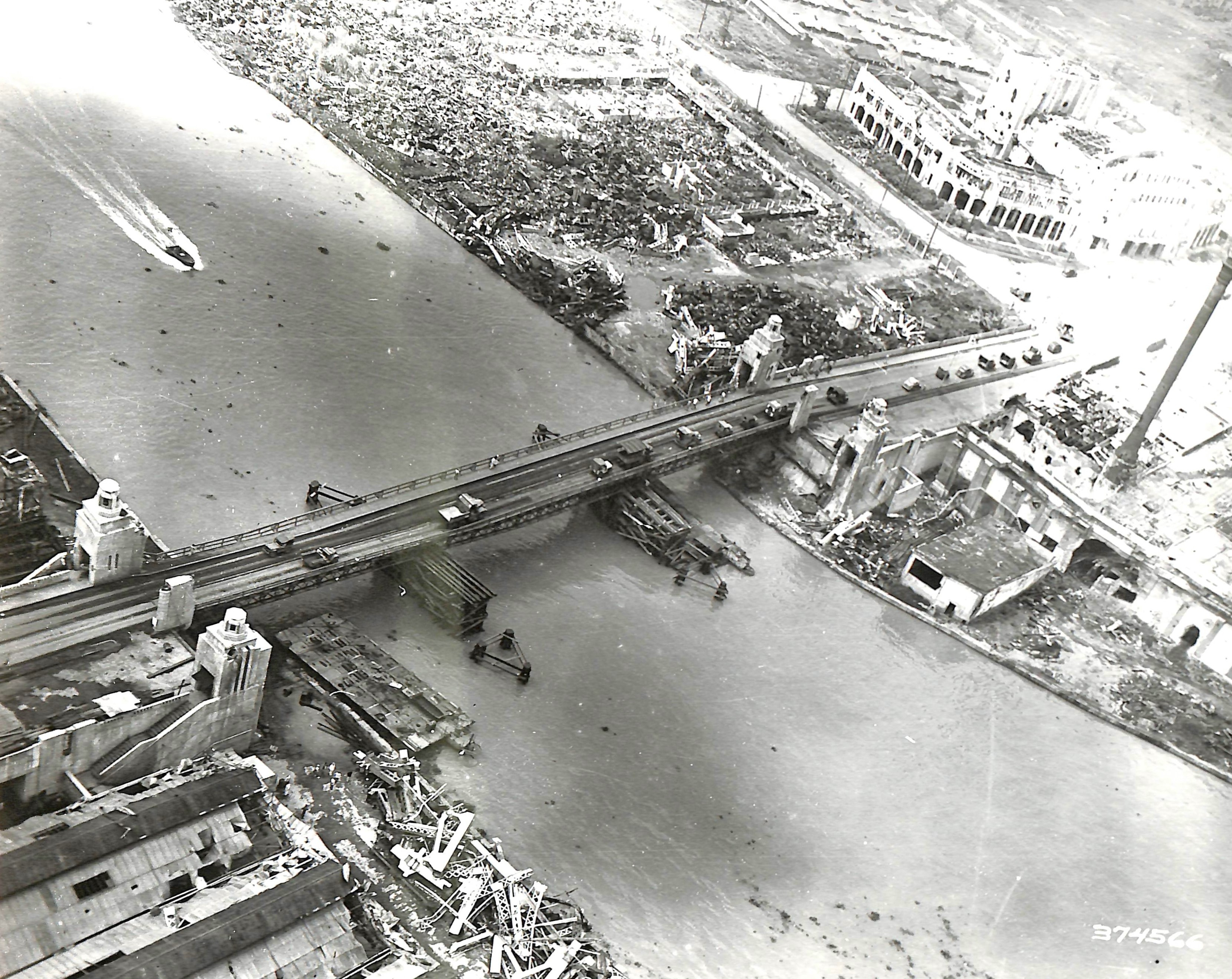
An aerial view of Manila after the Battle of Manila. The Metropolitan Theater, in the top-right corner of the photo, is damaged but still standing.

During the Battle of Manila in 1945, the Metropolitan Theater was bombed by American liberation forces. Although the Met lost its roof, the walls of the structure stood.

=== Post-war years (1945–2015) ===
In the subsequent post-war years, the shell of the Met was used for a variety of commercial establishments and as a home for informal settlers.

During the Marcos administration, First Lady Imelda Marcos initiated the public restoration of the Metropolitan Theater, along with other historical buildings. In 1978, ₱30 million was allocated for the restoration through a loan from the Government Service Insurance System (GSIS). The restoration was done under the supervision of the architects Otilio and Alejandro Arellano, both nephews of the Met's original architect Juan M. Arellano.

The Metropolitan Theater re-opened in December 1978, after just four months of work, making the pre-Christmas opening deadline desired by Imelda Marcos. President Ferdinand Marcos said that he hoped the Metropolitan Theater would "emerge as the shining monument to the cultural enlightenment of the New Filipino." The Met re-opened with a production of Rosauro de la Cruz's "Isang Munting Alamat" produced by the Kabataang Barangay, then-chaired by President Marcos's daughter Imee.

From 1979 to 1986, the Metropolitan Theater staged five to six shows yearly. Due to the lack of sponsorships, Executive Director Conchita Sunico rented out the space to GMA Radio-Television Arts for Vilma Santos's variety show Vilma! and leased out office space in the building, allowing it to survive despite financial difficulties.

The Met closed its doors again in 1996 following conflicts of ownership between the Manila City government and the Government Service Insurance System (GSIS).

In 2010, President Gloria Macapagal Arroyo attempted to revive the Metropolitan Theater, to no avail. That same year, the Met was recognized as a National Cultural Treasure under the National Cultural Heritage Act.

=== Under the NCCA, restoration, and re-opening (2015–present) ===
In May 2015, the Department of Budget and Management released ₱270 million from the National Endowment Fund for Culture and the Arts to fund the purchase of the Metropolitan Theater from its owner, the Government Service Insurance System (GSIS). The DBM released the funds to the National Commission for Culture and the Arts (NCCA), which, according to the National Cultural Heritage Act, held the right of first refusal on the sale of national cultural treasures. On June 30, 2015, the GSIS turned over ownership of the Met to the NCCA.

Soon after, in December 2015, the NCCA launched the "METamorphasis" project through which students interacted with the theater through bi-weekly cleanup drives. It also included music programs and tours of the theater grounds. The project ran until April 2016, paving the way for the eventual restoration of the building.

The initial restoration construction work began in February 2017 but was suspended when discovering of original features led the NCCA to revise the designs, with work resuming in 2019. The goal of the NCCA-led restoration was to preserve the building and restore it to its pre-war state, as designed by Juan M. Arellano. Thus, additional structures, such as those added during the 1978 restoration under Imelda Marcos, were removed. The first phase of the restoration focused on the Main Theater and was completed by March 2020. The second phase focused on the exteriors, while the third and final phase focused on fixing the office spaces and the Grand Ballroom.

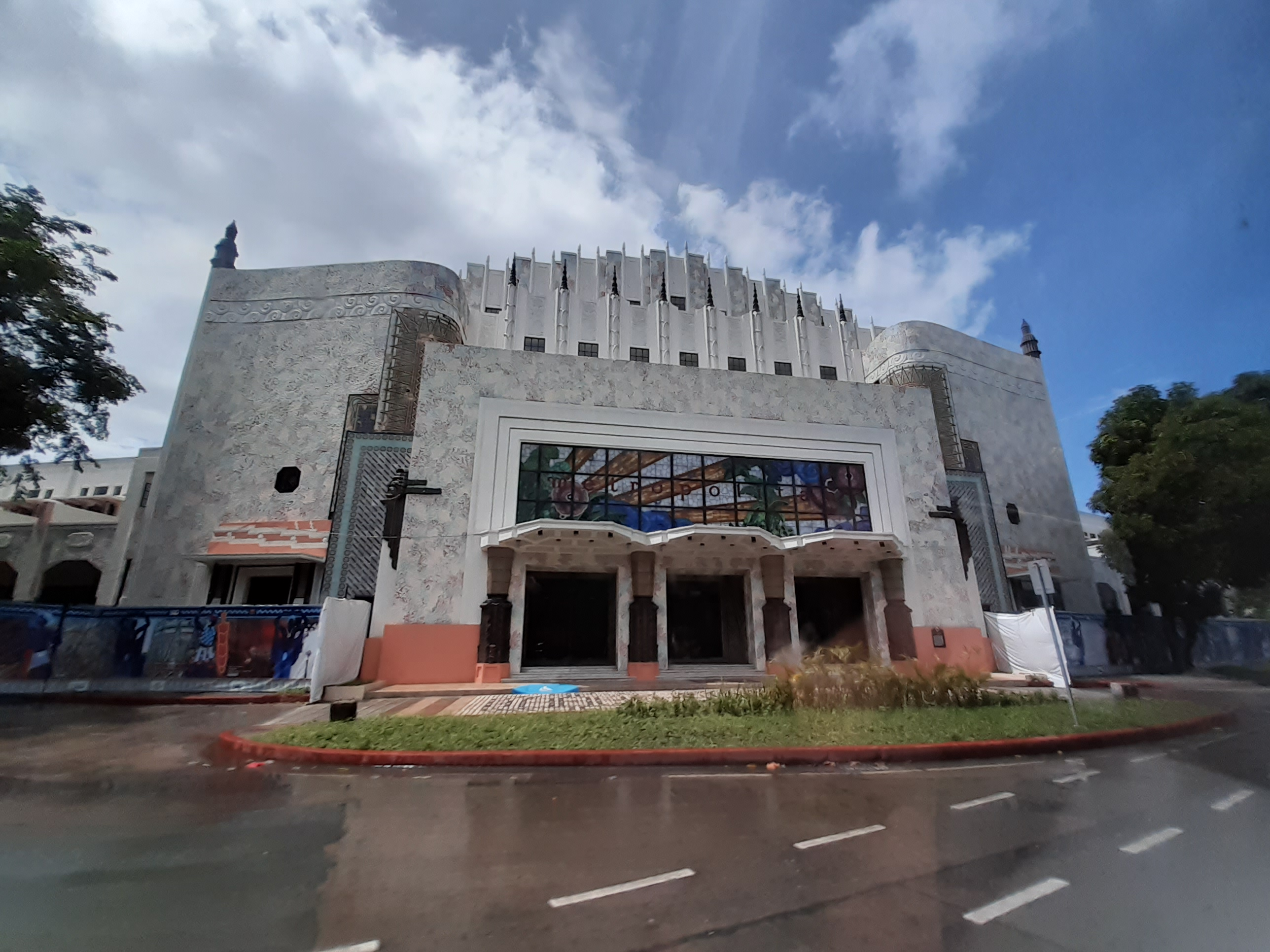
The theater in 2021, post-renovation

On December 10, 2021, the Metropolitan Theater celebrated its 90th anniversary with its formal re-opening. Previously, it had a soft opening in June 2021, with its official reopening postponed several times due to the COVID-19 pandemic. On June 29, 2024, an orchestral event "OST Symphony: K-drama in Concert" was held in the Metropolitan Theater.

The theater hosted the state necrological service for National Artist Nora Aunor on April 22, 2025.

== Architecture ==
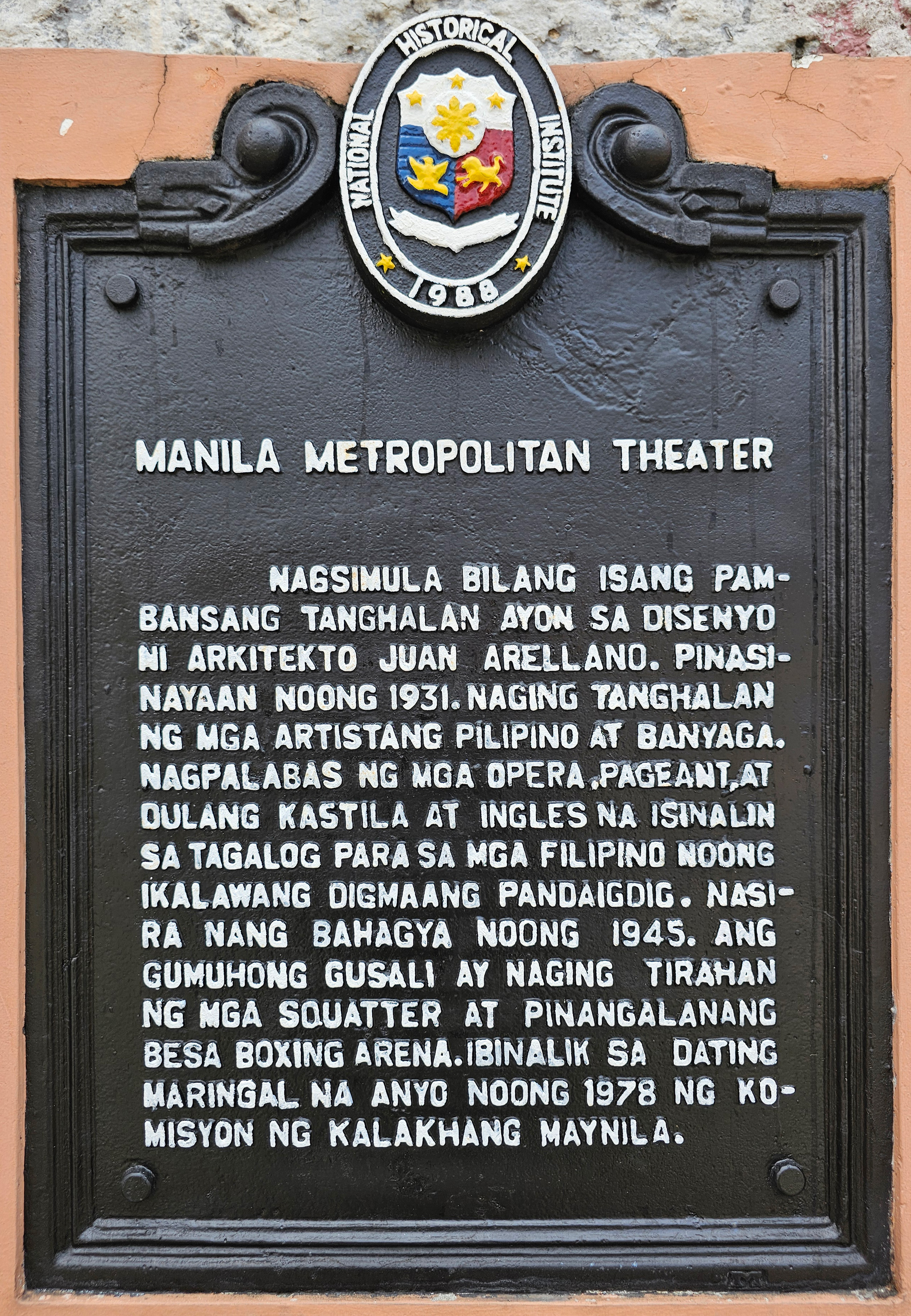
Marker installed by the National Historical Institute in 1988

The Metropolitan Theater was designed by Filipino architect Juan M. Arellano in the Art Deco style. Arellano was inspired by the phrase "On Wings of Song" for the structural configuration of the building: a rectangular-shaped auditorium flanked by pavilions on either side. Throughout the design, Arellano weaved Filipino decorative elements into the Art Deco style. Philippine Magazine editor A.V.H. Hartendorp described the style as "modern expressionistic."

=== Exterior ===
The façade's focal point is its proscenium-like central window of stained glass that corresponds with the shape and scale of the Main Theater inside. The stained glass marquee was executed by the Kraut Art Glass Company, with the "Metropolitan" label backlit and surrounded by Filipino floral motifs.

The stained glass marquee is highlighted on both sides by curving walls of colorful, decorated tiles resembling batik patterns of Southeast Asia. There are also moldings of zigzag and wavy lines that go with the sponged and painted multi-colored walls. The wall that frames the stained glass is a segmented arch with rows of small finials on the upper edge. Muslim-inspired minarets crown the top of the concave roof, which suggested its status as a theater back in its prime days. Located at the entrance are elaborate wrought iron gates which are patterned into leaf designs and various lines. Accenting the ground level are capiz lamps and banana-leaf formed pillars which go alternately with the theater's entrances.

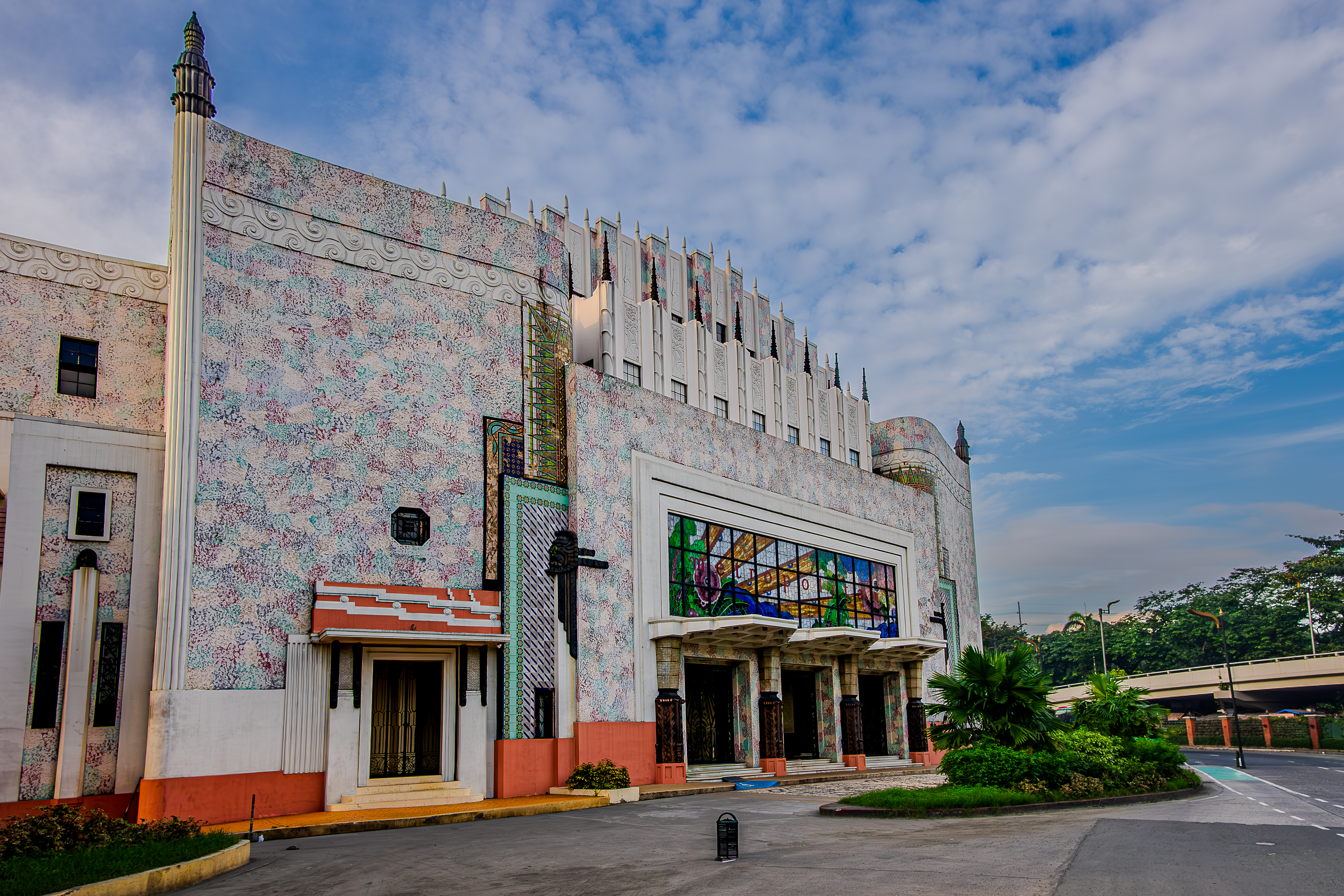
Exterior at daytime

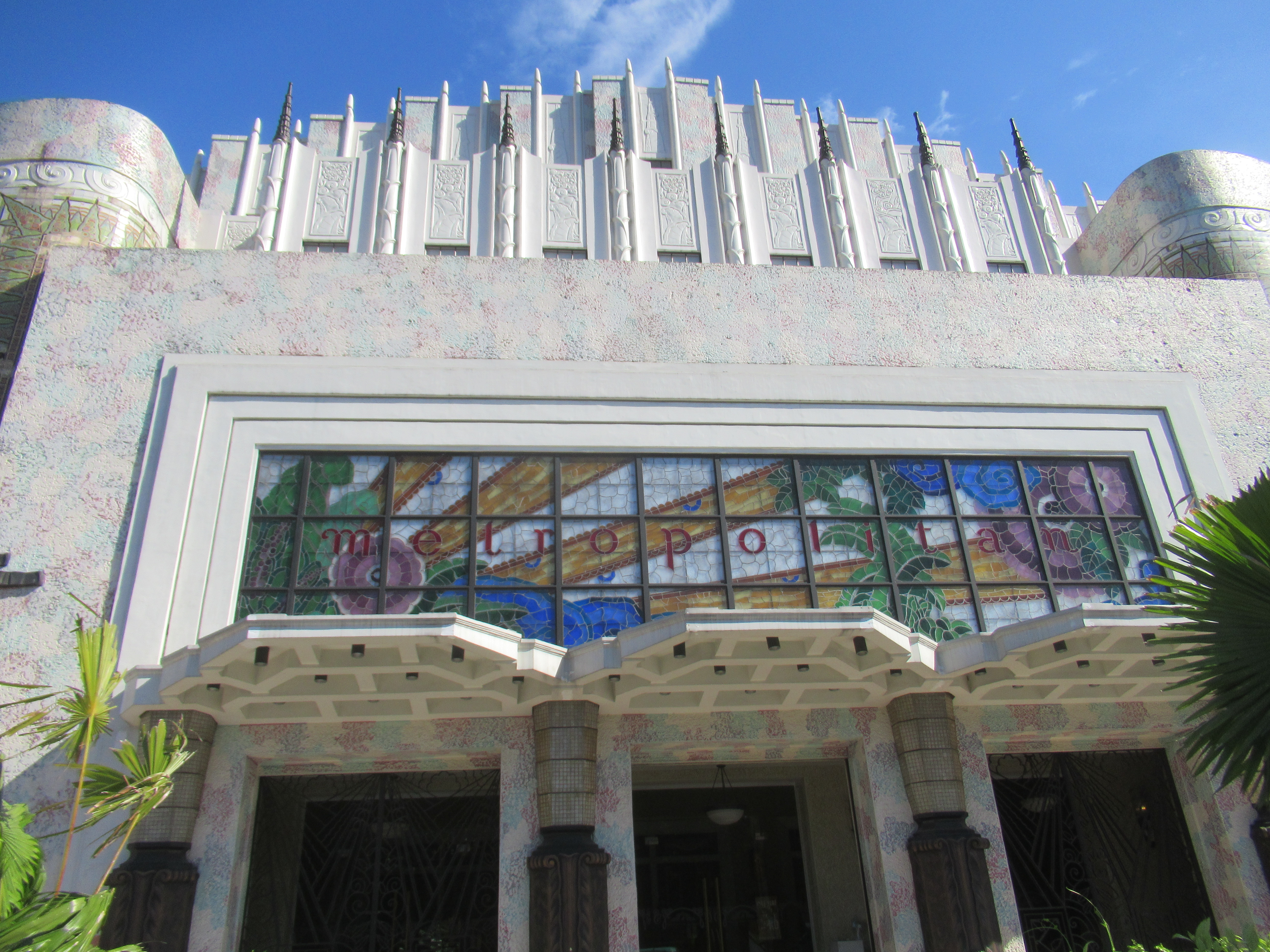
Stained glass mural

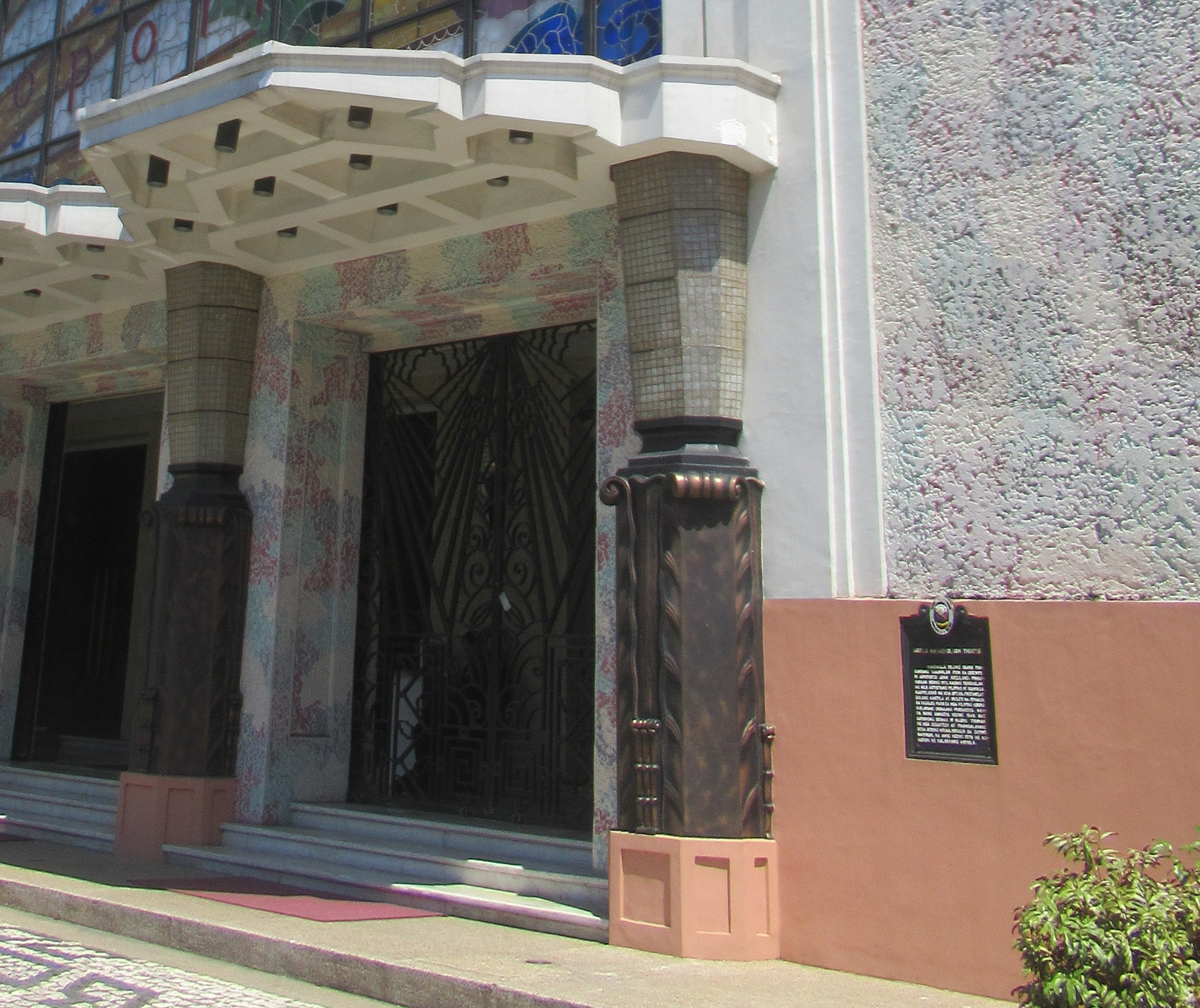
Façade detail with NHI marker

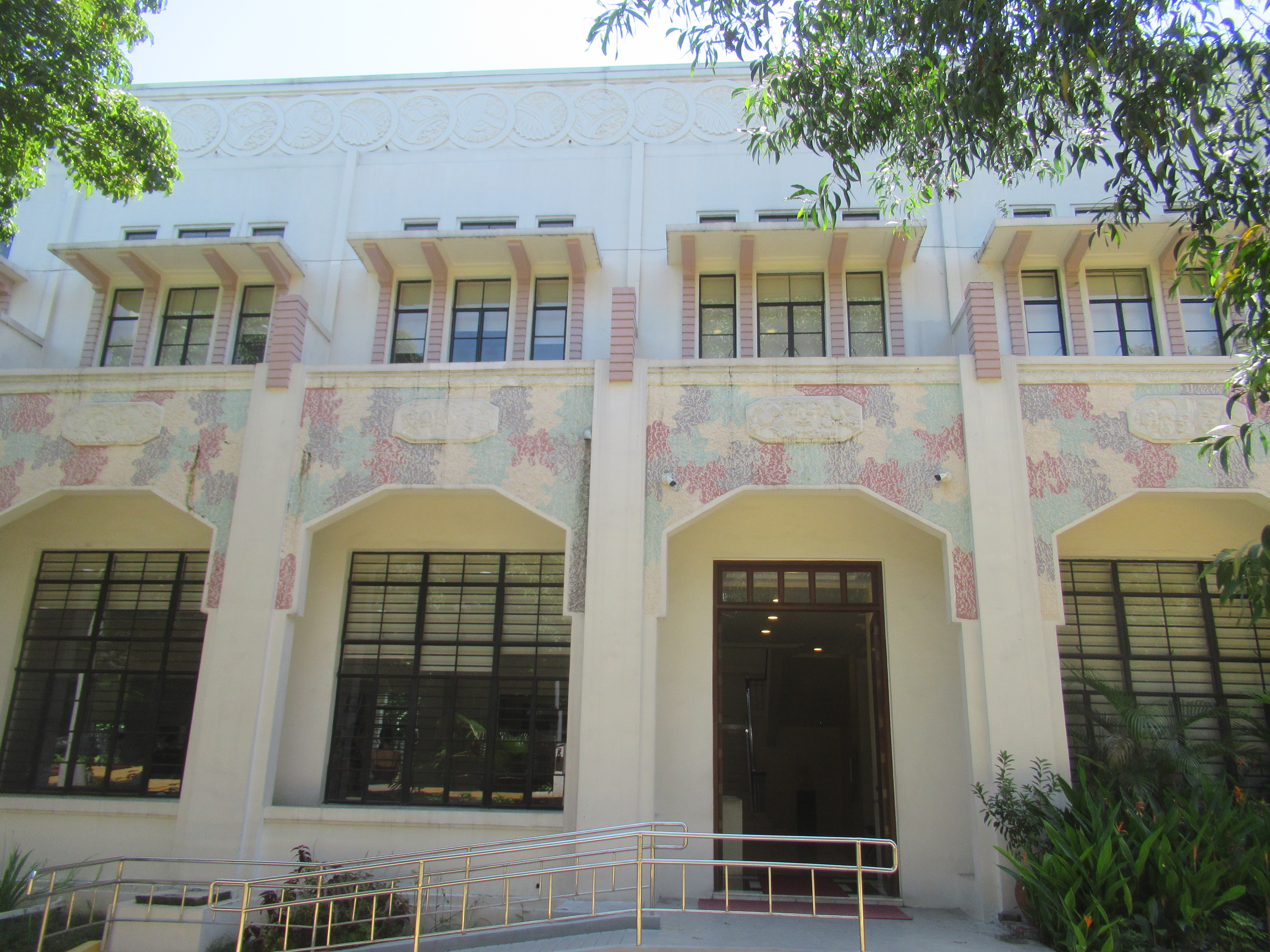
Side entrance

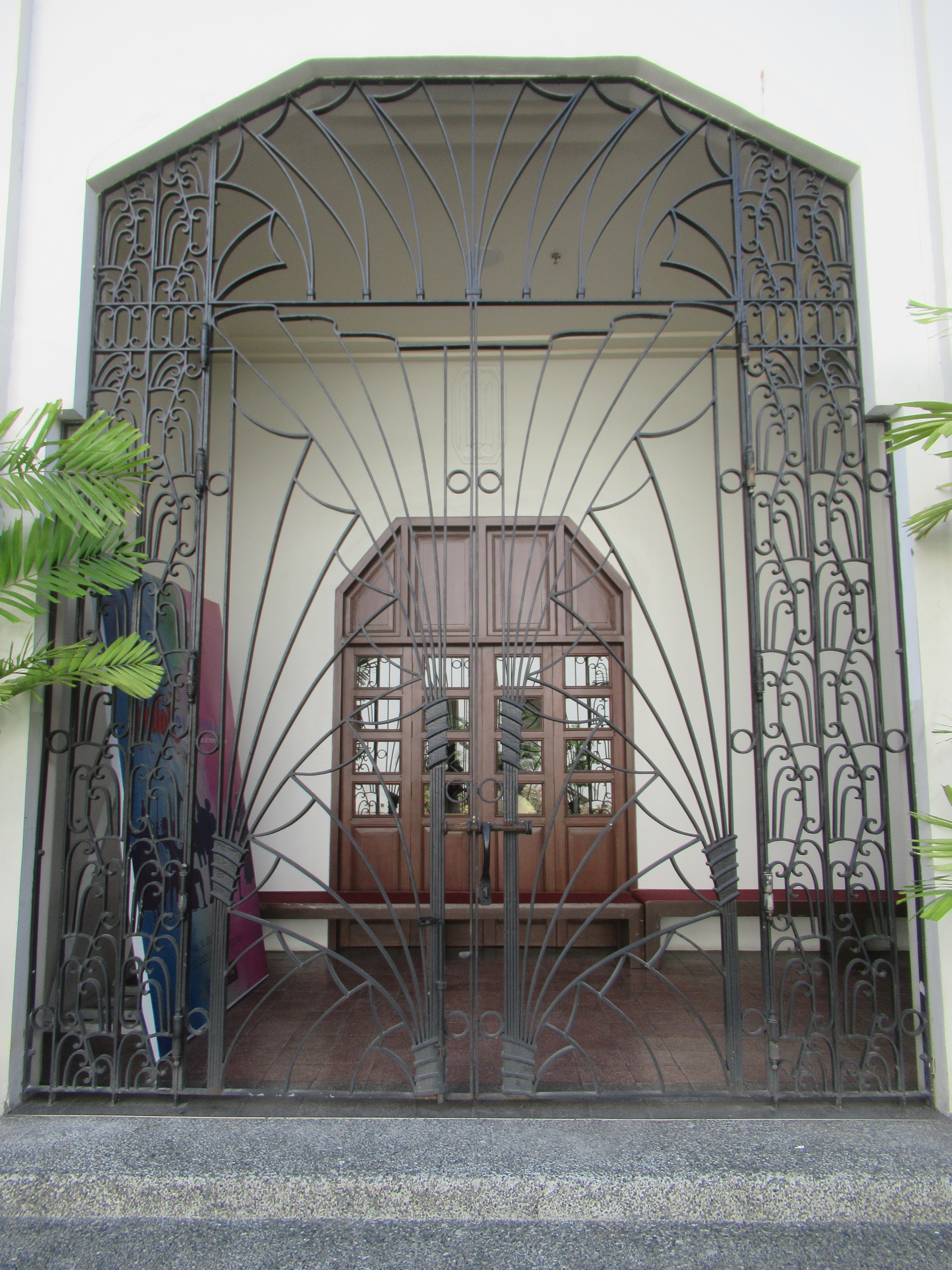
Grillwork detail

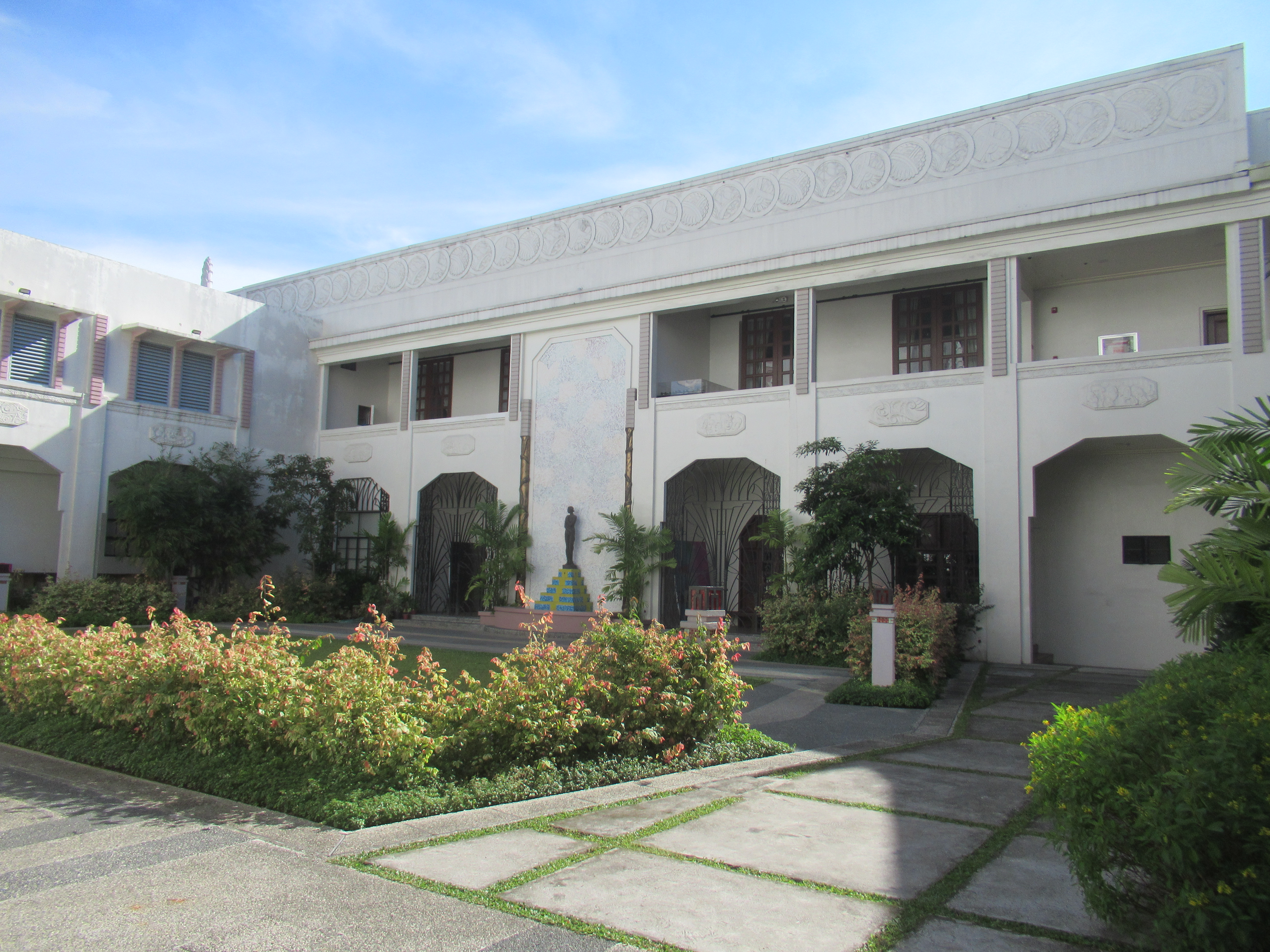
Inner courtyard

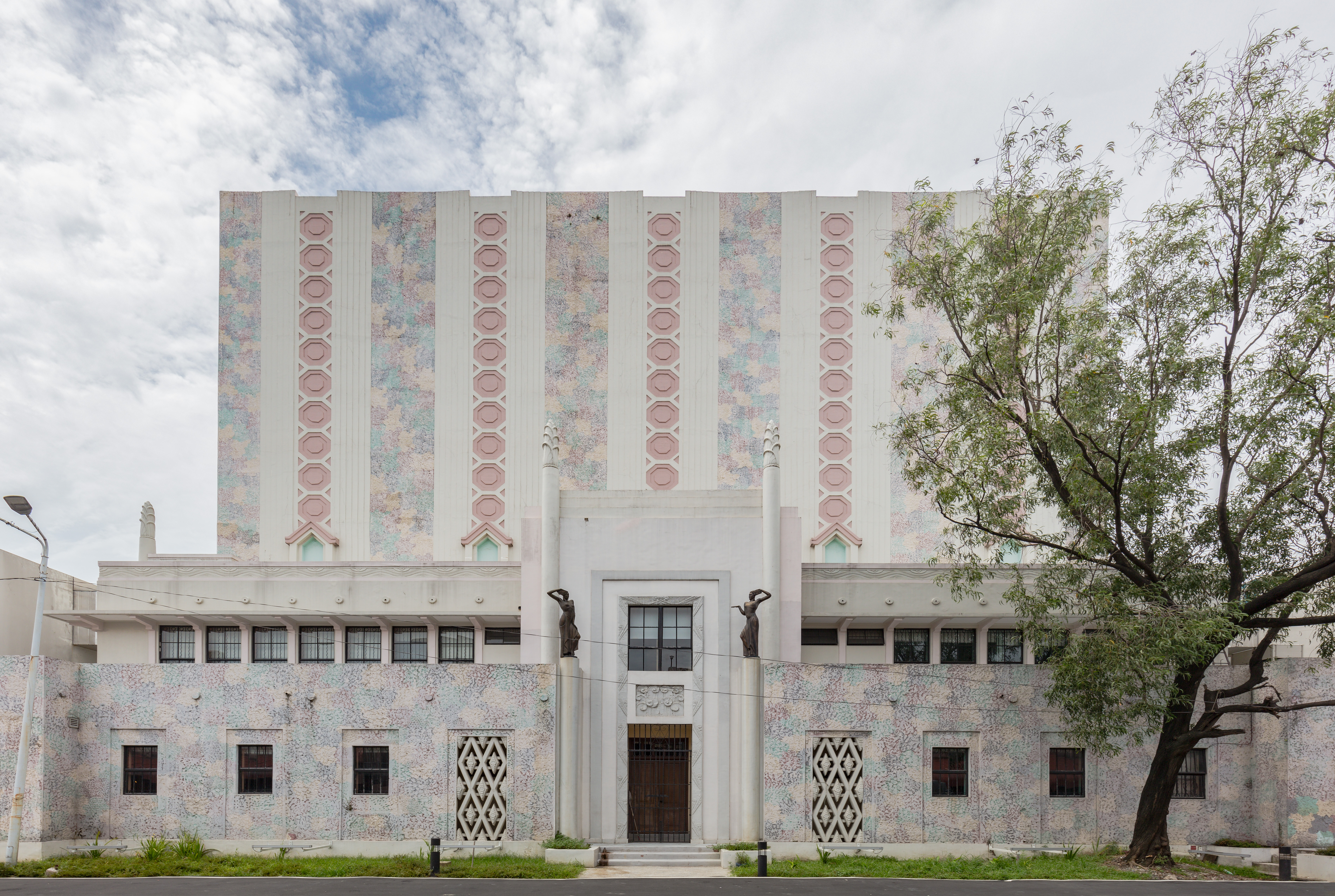
Fly tower

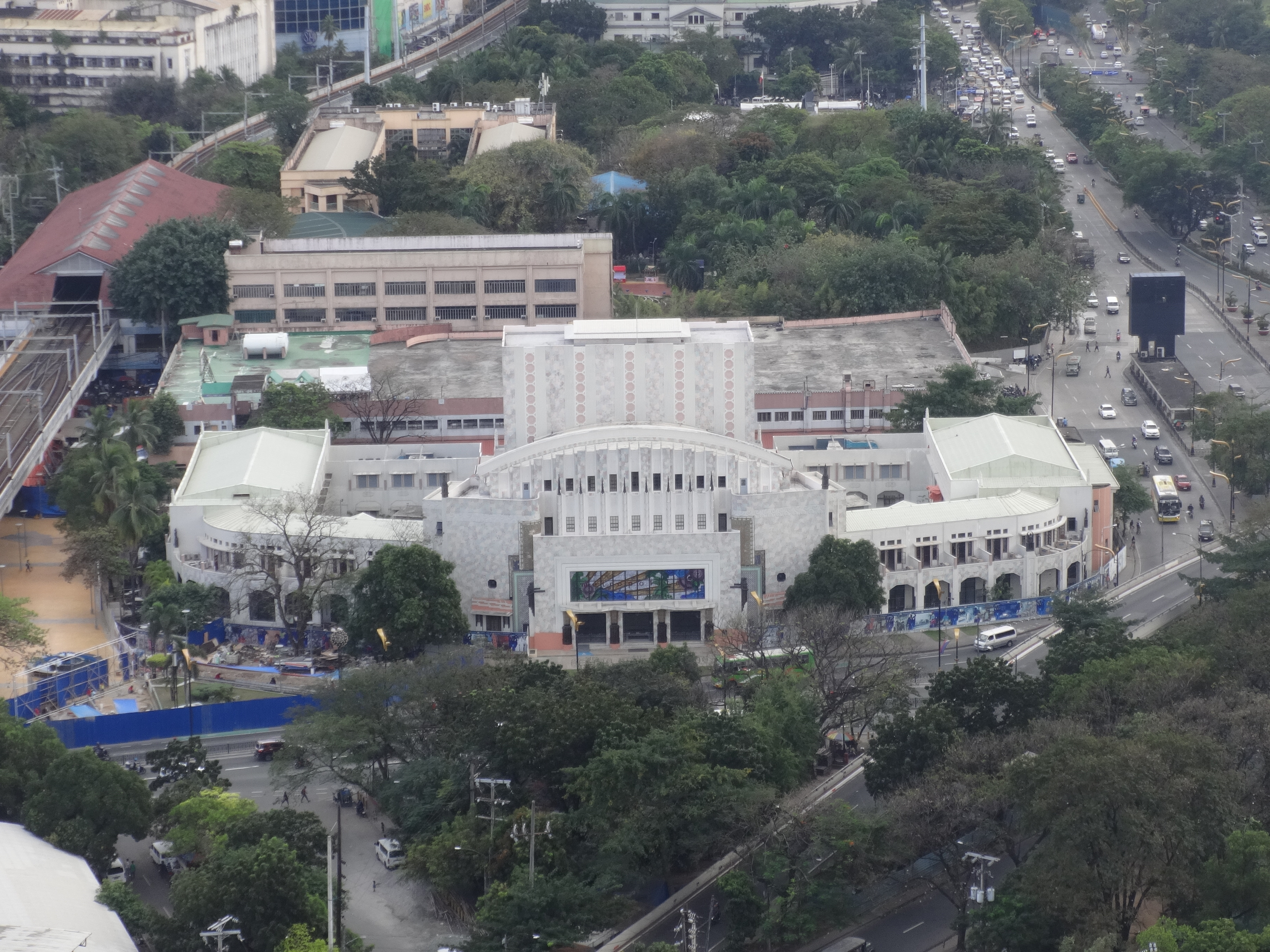
The theater from the air

=== Interior ===
==== Foyer ====
The Main Theater is accessed through a foyer with a two-story ceiling and stairways on either side leading to the balcony. By the stairways are the Adam and Eve bronze sculptures done by Italian artist Franceso Riccardo Monti. Displayed on opposite sides of the foyer are two mural paintings by National Artist Fernando Amorsolo, titled The Dance and The History of Music. Since the 1996 foreclosure, the original murals are in the GSIS Museum and so reproductions were made for the NCCA-led restoration. The foyer's grillwork features a drooping floral balustrade in a geometric Art Deco style, originally crafted by Arcadio Arellano, the brother and collaborator of the Met's architect, Juan M. Arellano.

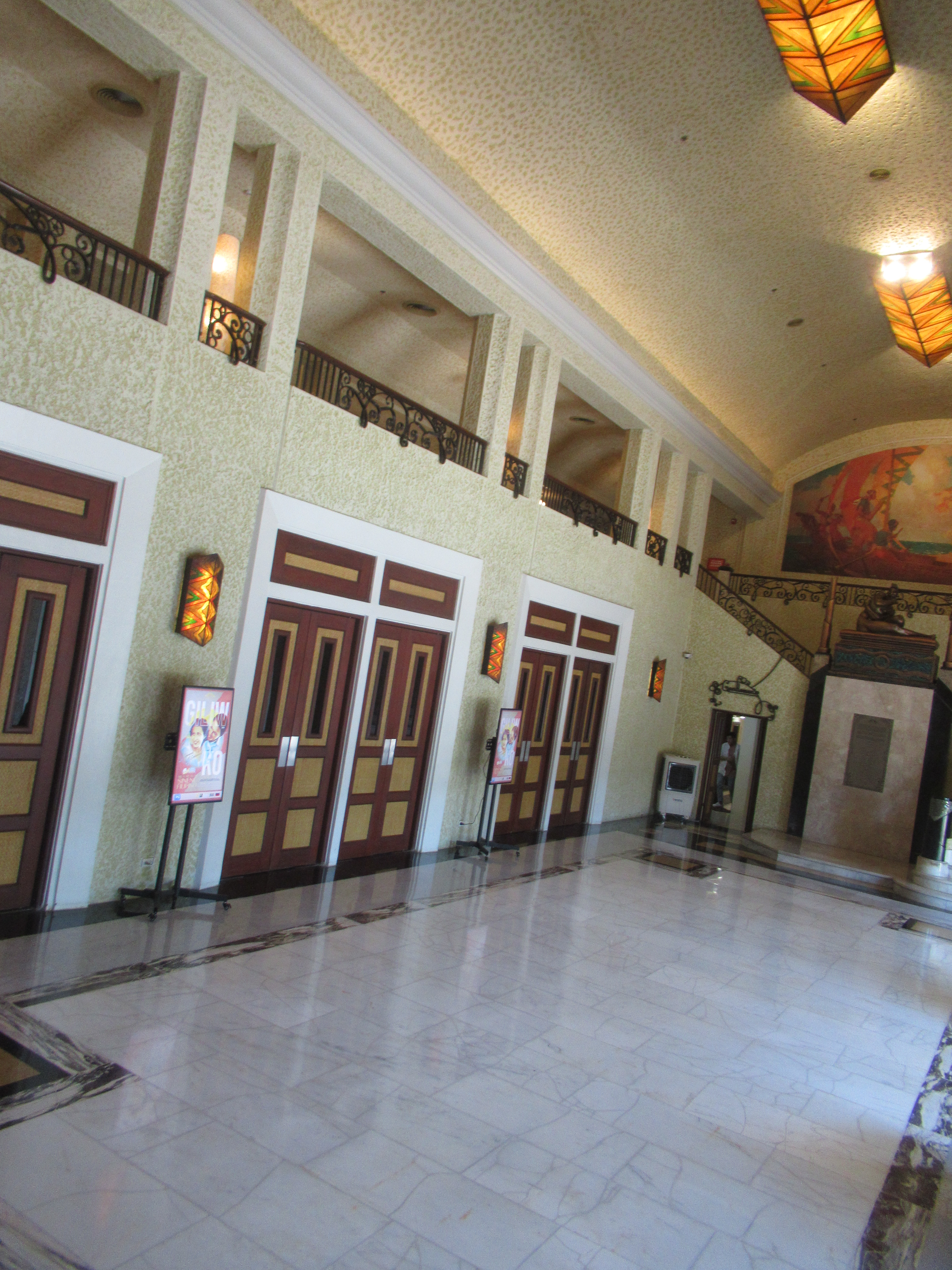
Foyer

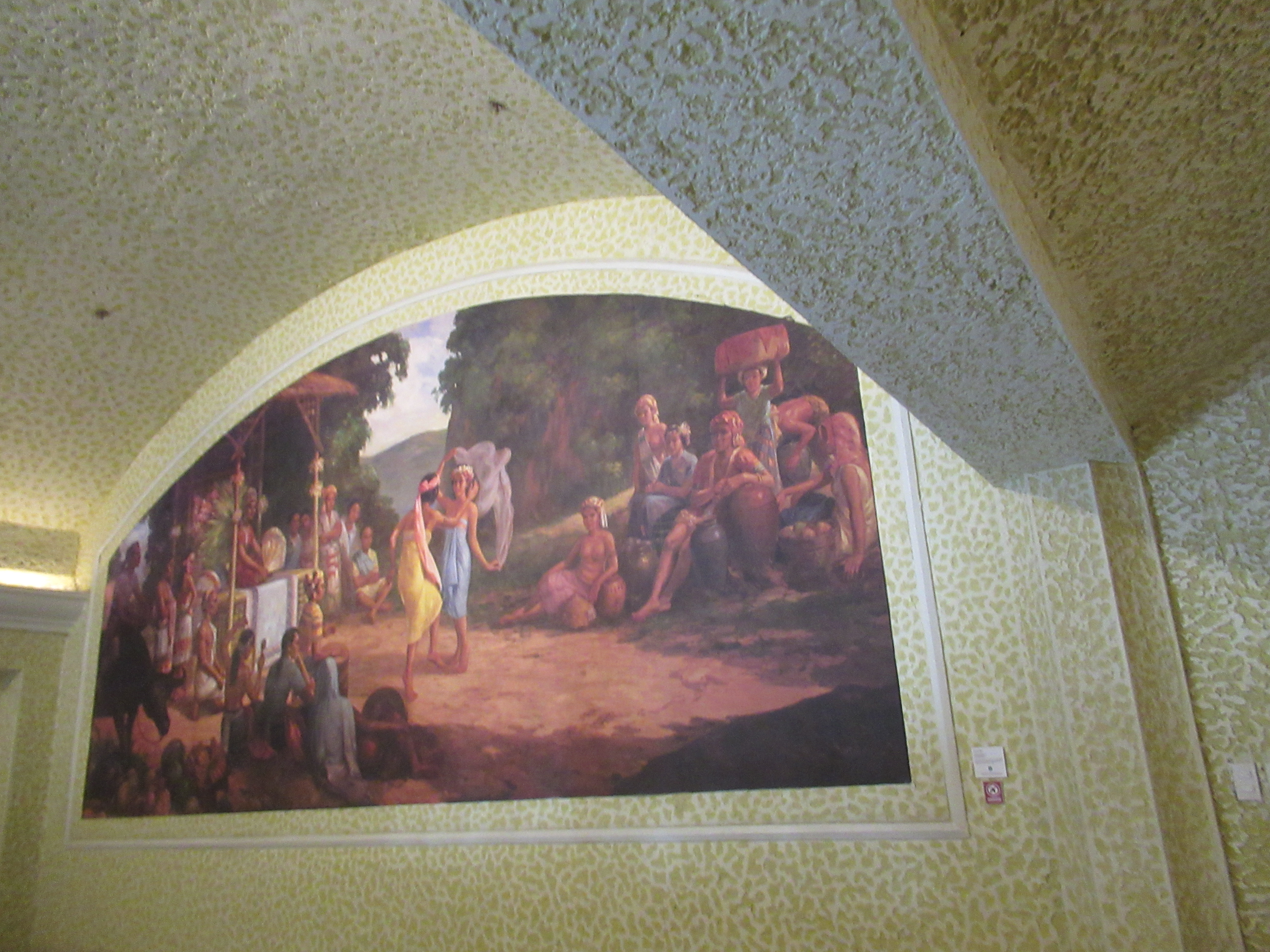
Reproduction of The Dance mural by NA Fernando Amorsolo

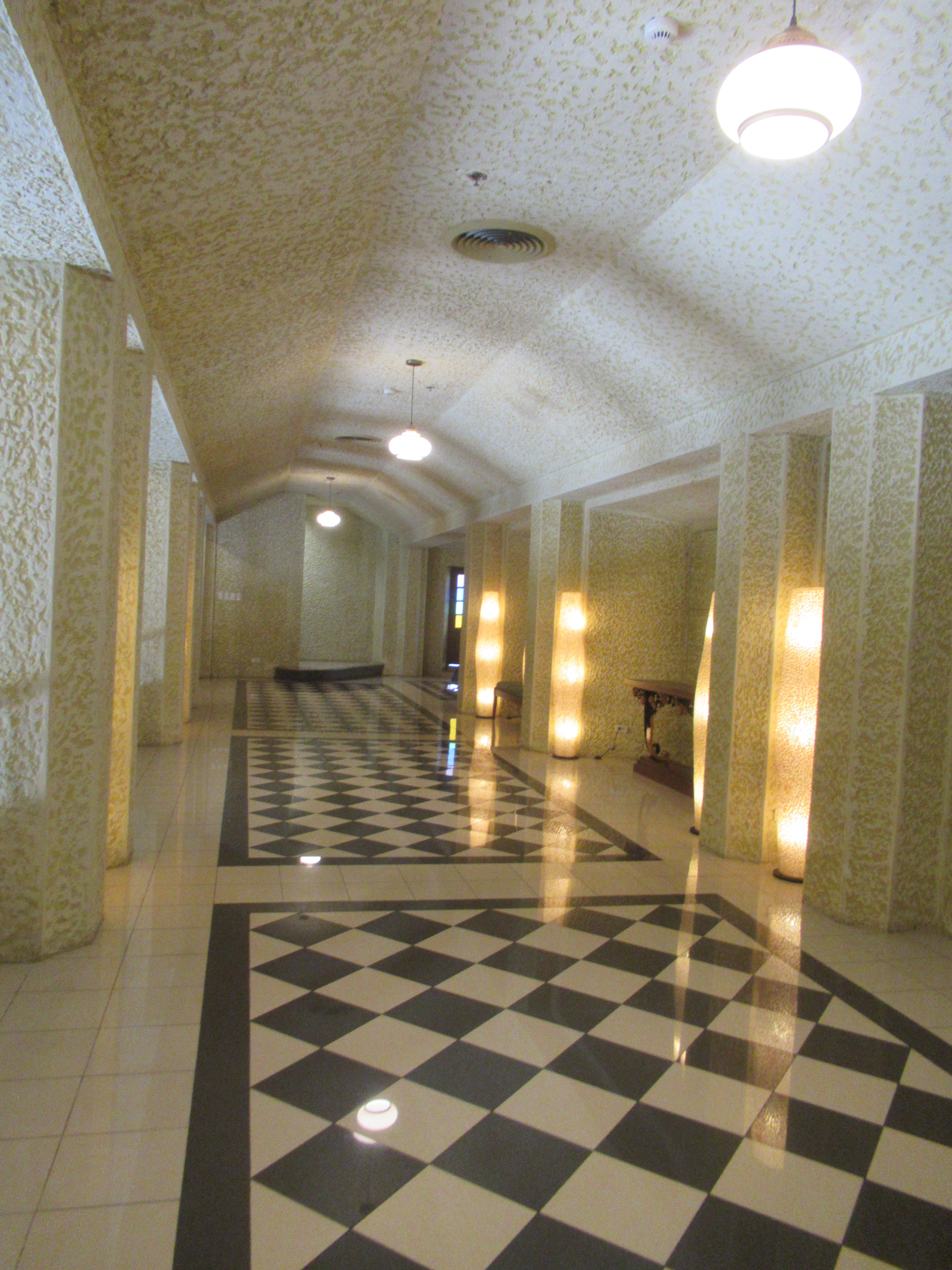
Hallway

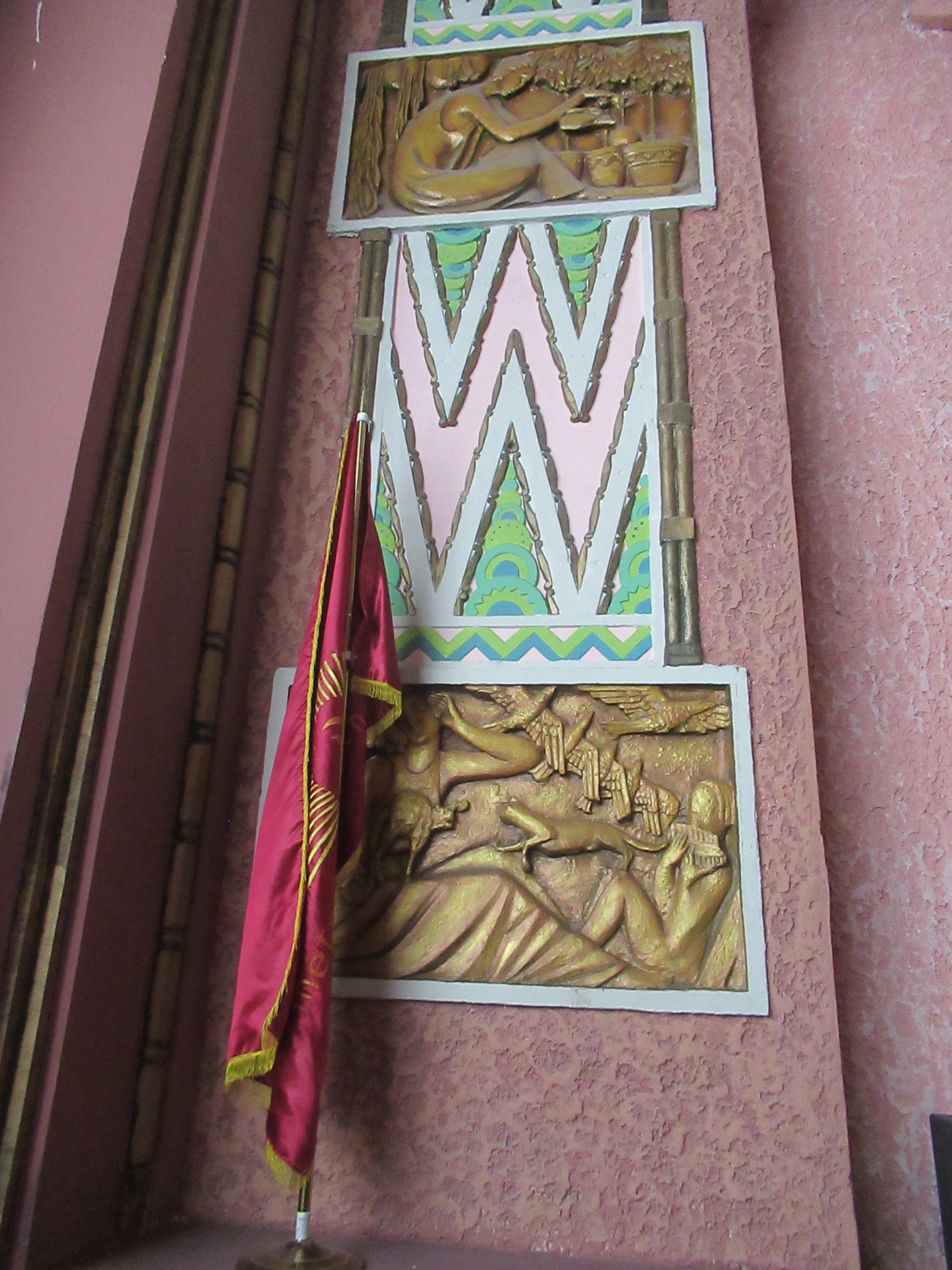
Wall details

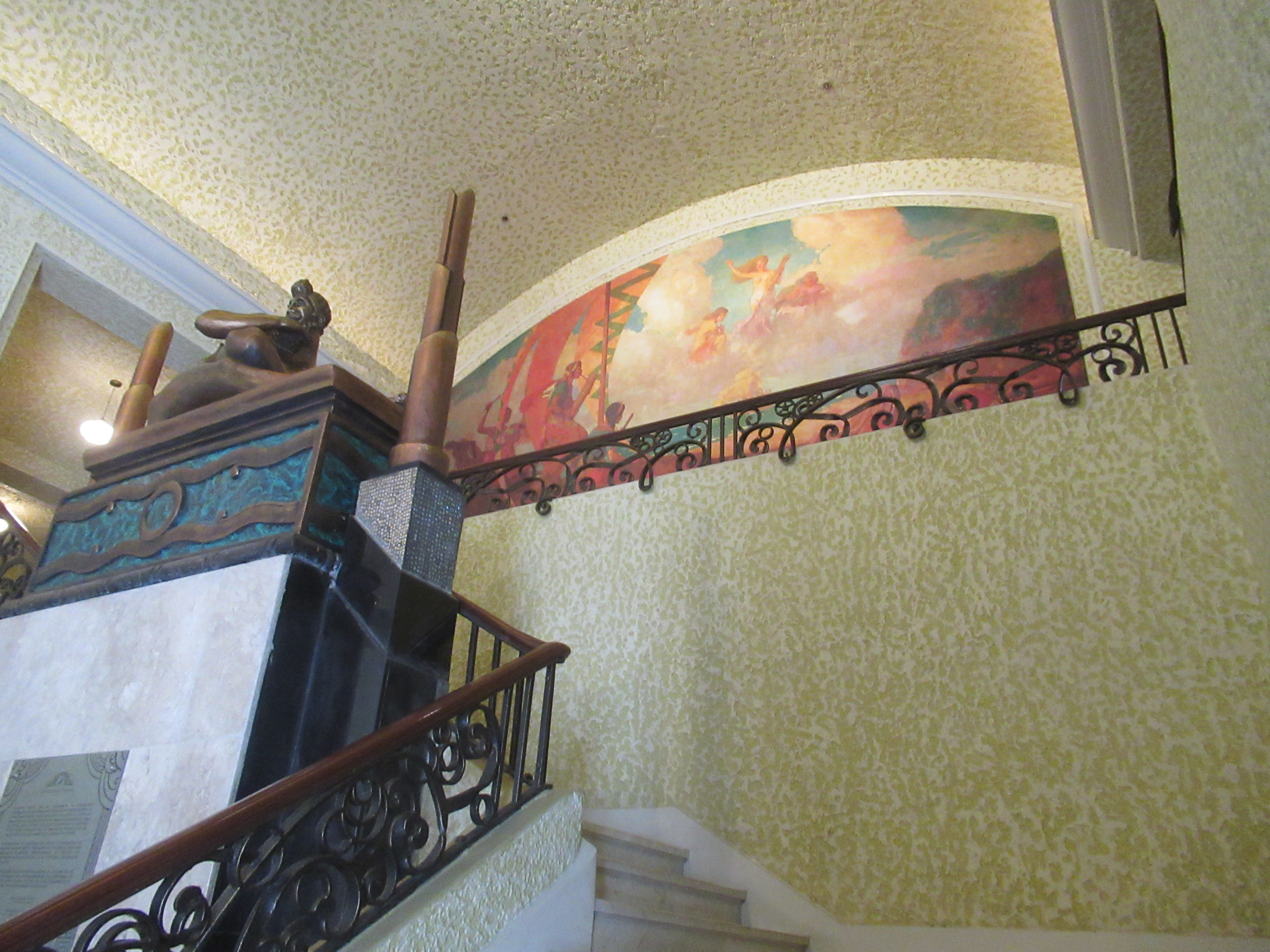
Bronze sculpture done by Francesco Riccardo Monti, with a reproduction of The History of Music mural by Fernando Amorsolo

==== Main Theater ====
In 2020, during its renovation, the capacity of the Main Theater was reduced from 1,600 to 990, and the floor's elevation was adjusted to comply with safety regulations.

The ceiling is decorated with Art Deco mangoes, bananas, and tropical leaves bas-reliefs designed by Isabelo Tampinco.

Above the proscenium arch are eight bas-relief figures by Francesco Riccardo Monti. Originally intending to reproduce the figures from historical photographs, in 2017, the NCCA were surprised to discover the original Monti figures intact after dismantling the anomalous additions from the 1978 restoration.

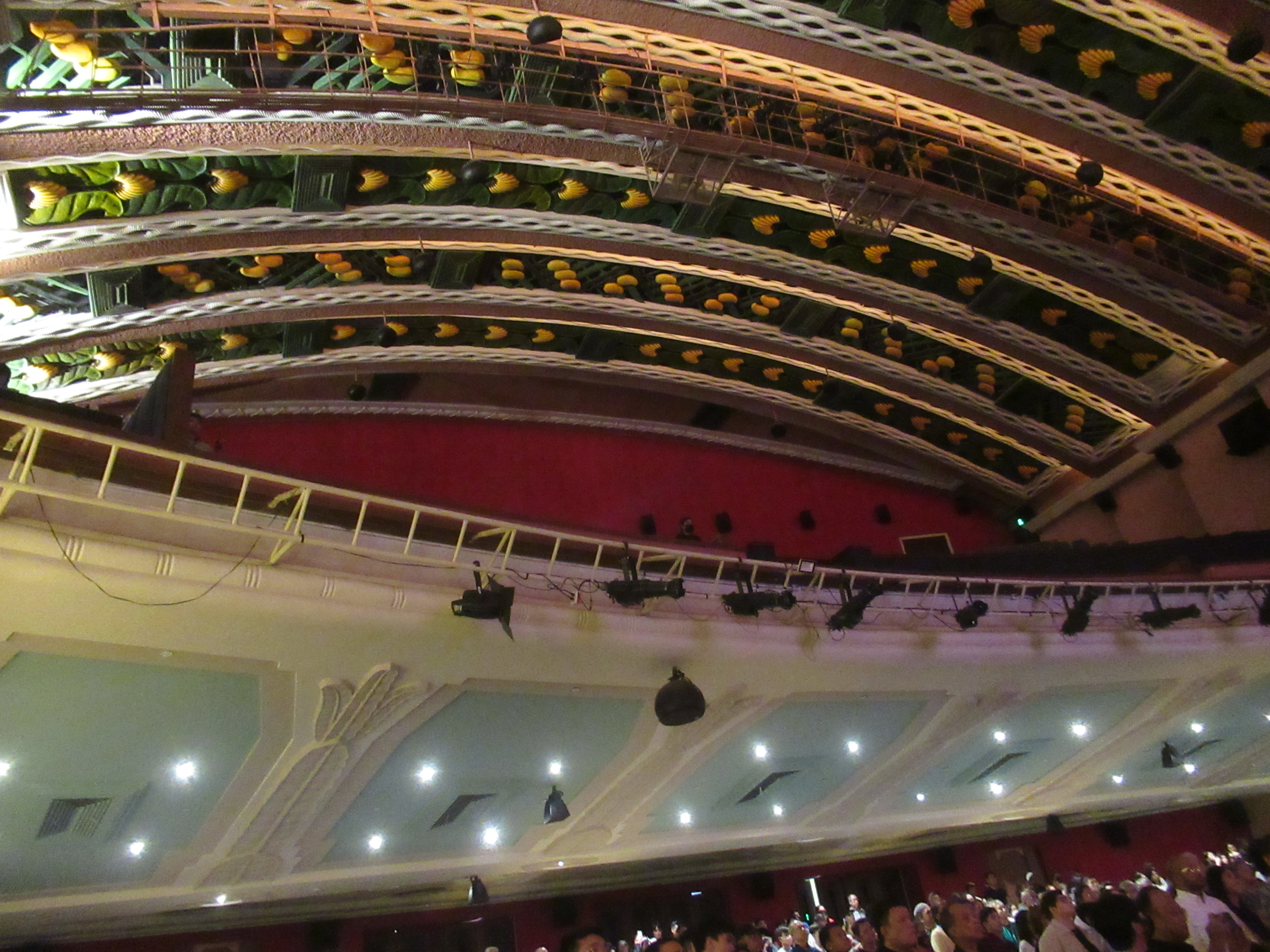
Main theater ceiling with bas-reliefs designed by Isabelo Tampinco

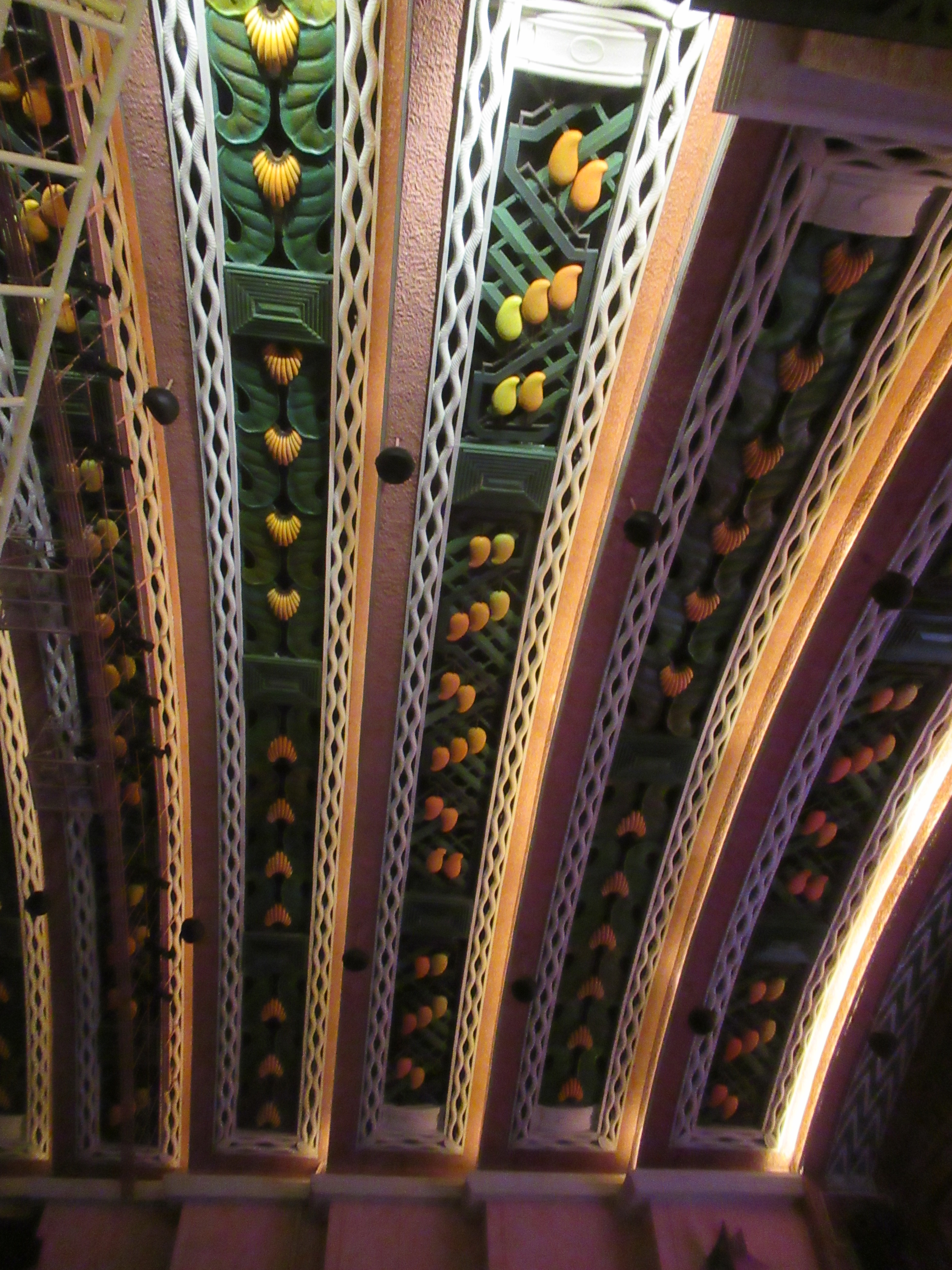
Ceiling detail showing tropical fruits
