= Santa Catalina College =

Roman Catholic college in Manila, Philippines

- Dalubhasaang Santa Catalina (Filipino)
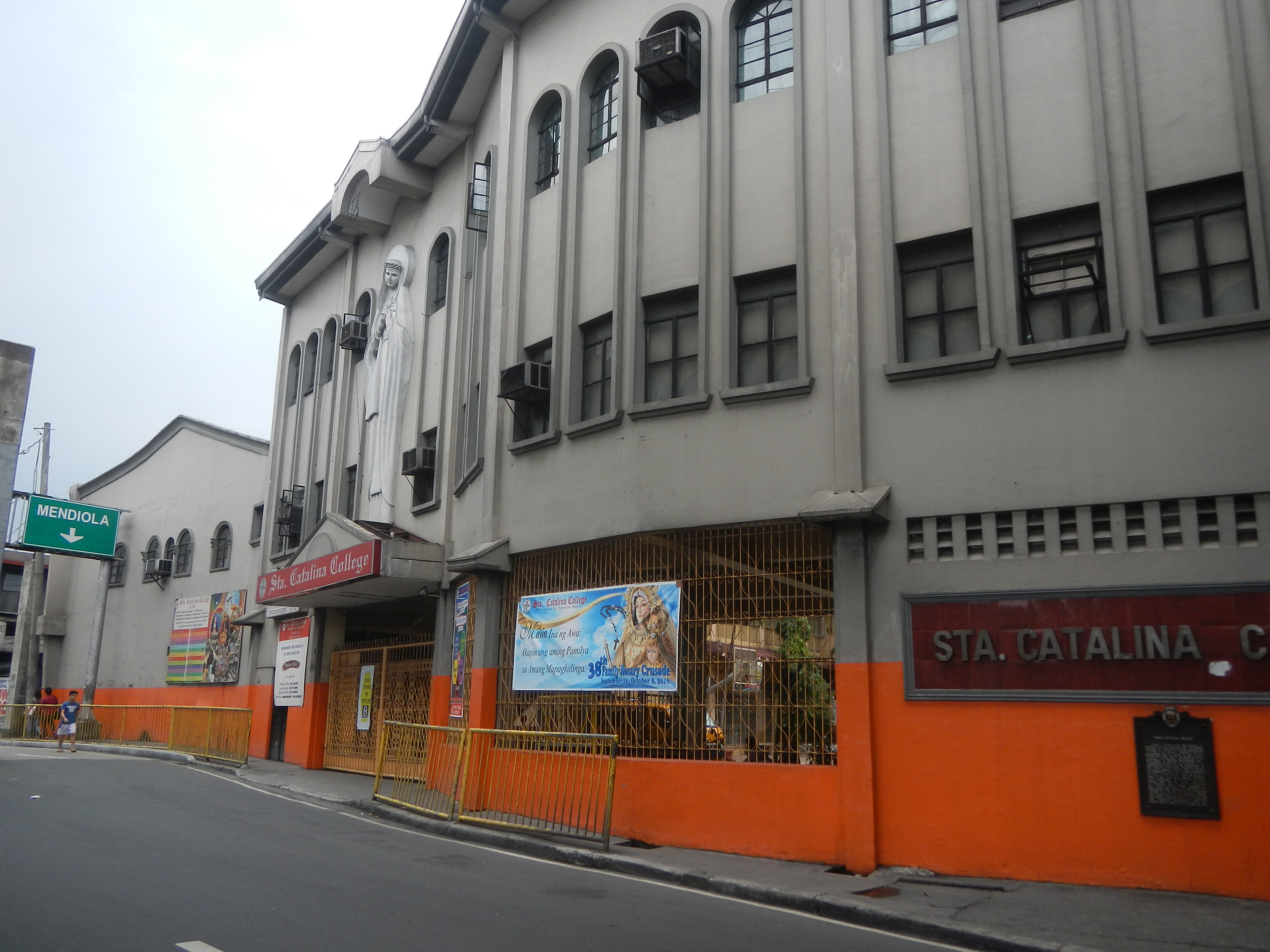
- School facade
- Former names: Colegio de Santa Catalina (1706–); Santa Catalina College
- Motto: Passion for Truth and Compassion for Humanity
- Type: Private Catholic, Dominican coeducational basic and higher education institution
- Established: 1706; 320 years ago
- Founder: Mother Francisca del Espiritu Santo de Fuentes
- Religious affiliation: Roman Catholic (Siena Sisters)
- Academic affiliations: OP-Siena Schools System, CEAP, Dominican Network, PAASCU
- President: Sr. Esther Bravante, OP
- Location: 2660 Legarda St., Sampaloc Manila, Metro Manila, Philippines; 14°36′02″N 120°59′50″E
- Campus: Urban
- Colors: Black - White - Red
- Nickname: Catherineans
- Website: sccmanila.edu.ph
- Location in Manila Location in Metro Manila Location in Luzon Location in the Philippines

Santa Catalina College is a Roman Catholic, private institution that serves coeducational basic and higher education administered by the Congregation of the Dominican Sisters of St. Catherine of Siena, a religious congregation affiliated with the Dominican Order located in Sampaloc, Manila. It was originally established by the Siena Sisters in 1706.

== History ==
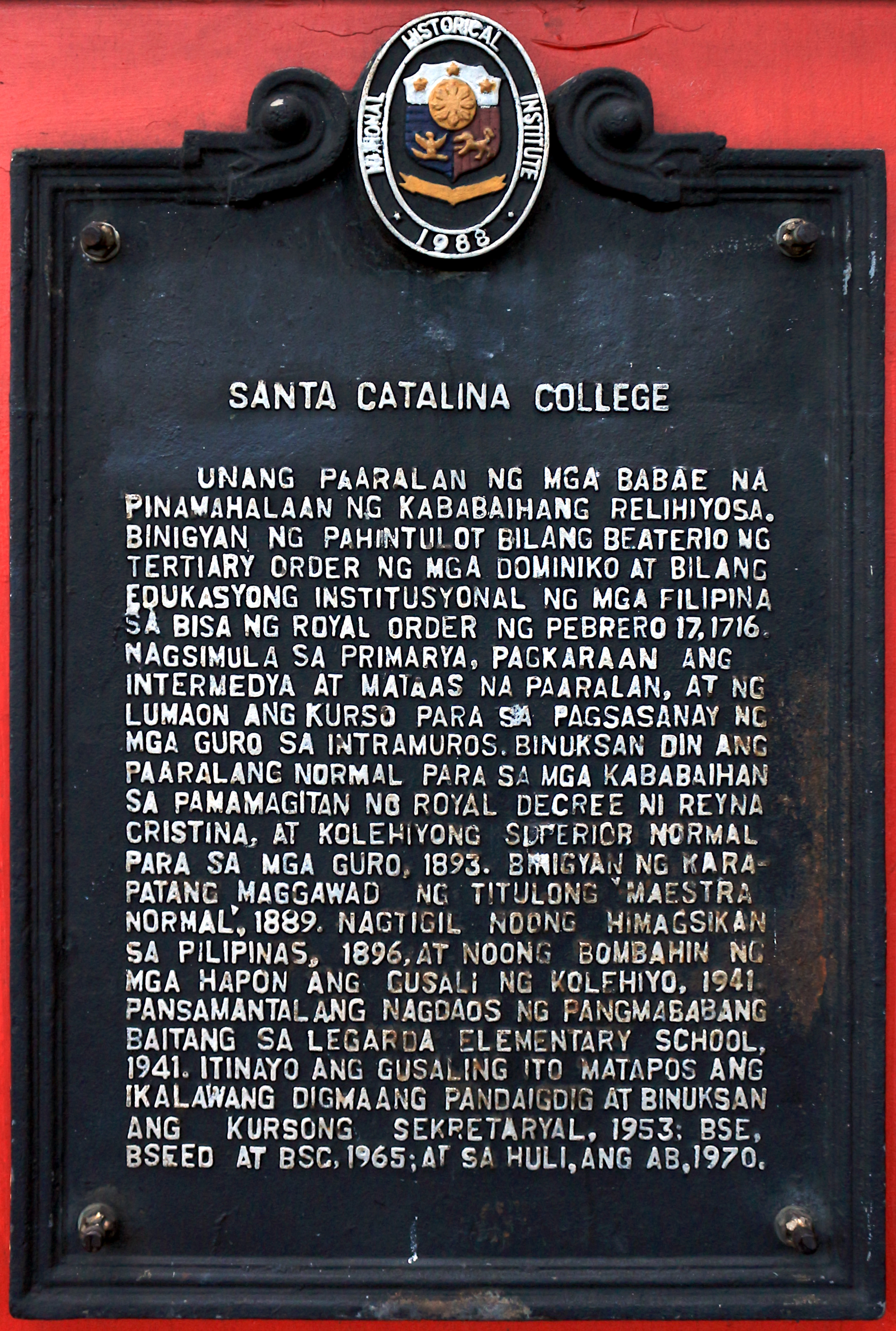
Historical marker installed by the National Historical Institute in 1988 to commemorate the college

The college traces its history to the establishment of the congregation Beaterio de Santa Catalina de Manila, a convent, on July 26, 1696 in Intramuros in the Spanish Philippines. It was a religious congregation for Spanish religious women, under the leadership of Mother Francisca del Espiritu Santo, who served as the first prioress of the congregation in the country and Rev. Fr. Juan de Sto. Domingo, who served as the congregation's adviser.

The congregation soon began accepting indigenous girls as well, in contrast to the other religious congregations at the time which only accepted Spanish women. At the same time, it was also beginning to be involved in the ministry of educating young women. Thus in 1706, the congregation established the Colegio de Santa Catalina, transforming the beaterio into a convent and a center of learning for women, both Spanish and Filipina women. Santa Catalina was the first educational institution run by religious women; it taught women the principles of Catholic faith and Christian living, as well as training on creative and domestic arts. The school was eventually placed under a royal patronage on February 17, 1716.

In 1863, the school was authorized to offer teacher training courses. In 1889, it was granted the privilege to confer the academic degree of Maestra Normal by royal decree. Despite damage due to the earthquakes of 1863 and 1880, the school's buildings were rebuilt in 1883; one of them underwent expansion in 1894. In addition, a 3-storey school building was constructed in 1939 under the supervision of the architecture firm of Pedro Siochi and Company.

The school campus was destroyed in 1941 by Japanese bombs; the tertiaries were forced to move the school to Legarda St. and the tertiaries’ convent to Sampaloc. Colegio de Santa Catalina was not rebuilt in its old Intramuros site after the war and Colegio de San Juan de Letran later acquired the property for the expansion of its campus.

The congregation proceeded to reopen Santa Catalina College in its new home along Legarda St. after the war with the construction of its present school building in 1951. The college started to offer a secretarial course in 1953, Bachelor of Science in Elementary Education (BSEEd) and Bachelor of Science in Commerce (BSC) in 1965. With the rapid increase of colleges and universities in the area, the college enrollment started to decline while the grade school and high school departments continued to prosper. During the school year 1979-1980, the college department was temporarily phased out and was re-opened in 1985 with the new course offerings:

== Academic programs ==
- Elementary (Grade 1-6)
- Pay High School (Grade 7-10)
- College (Bachelor of Elementary Education major in Religious Education)
