= Pedro Siochi =

Filipino architect

Pedro Angeles Siochi
- Born: 1886; Manila, Captaincy General of the Philippines
- Died: 1951 (aged 64–65); Manila, Philippines
- Education: University of Ghent, Belgium
- Occupation: Architect
- Practice: Pedro A. Siochi and Company
- Buildings: Legislative Building, Manila; Manila Metropolitan Theater, Manila; Cebu Provincial Capitol; Manila Central Post Office; Caliraya Dam, Laguna; Santa Catalina College, Manila; St. Scholastica's College, Manila

Pedro Angeles Siochi (1886–1951) was a Filipino architect and civil engineer of famous landmarks in the Philippines.

== Background ==
Pedro Siochi y Angeles was a Chinese-Spanish-Filipino architect and civil engineer of famous landmarks and structures in the Philippines. He was born in 1886 in Manila, Captaincy General of the Philippines.

== Education ==
Siochi attended the University of Ghent in Belgium. He later worked with the Philippine Bureau of Engineering and Construction.

== Career ==
=== Pedro Siochi and Company ===
Siochi was the founder and owner of the architecture firm Pedro Siochi and Company, Inc.

=== Notable works ===
Among the significant works of Pedro Siochi and Company are famous Philippine landmarks, namely:

- Talavera River Irrigation System in Bulacan (1923)
- Culasi Port in Roxas City (1926)
- Manila Central Post Office (1926) with Arch. Juan M. Arellano and Arch. Tomás Mapúa (1926)
- Legislative Building (1926) with Arch. Ralph Harrington Doane, Arch. Antonio Toledo, And Arch. Juan M. Arellano
- Manila Metropolitan Theater (1931) with Arch. Juan M. Arellano
- St. Cecilia's Hall of St. Scholastica's College (1932) with Arch. Andres Luna San Pedro
- Taal Vista Lodge in Laguna (1937–39) with Andres Luna de San Pedro
- Cebu Provincial Capitol (1938) with Juan M. Arellano
- Caliraya Dam in Laguna (1939)
- Santa Catalina College (1952).

== Death ==
Siochi died in 1951 in Manila, the Philippines.

== See also ==
- Manila Metropolitan Theater
- Manila Central Post Office
- Legislative Building
- Cebu Provincial Capitol
- Caliraya Dam
