= National Museum of Fine Arts (Manila) =

Art museum in Manila, Philippines

- Pambansang Museo ng Sining (Filipino)
- The museum in 2026

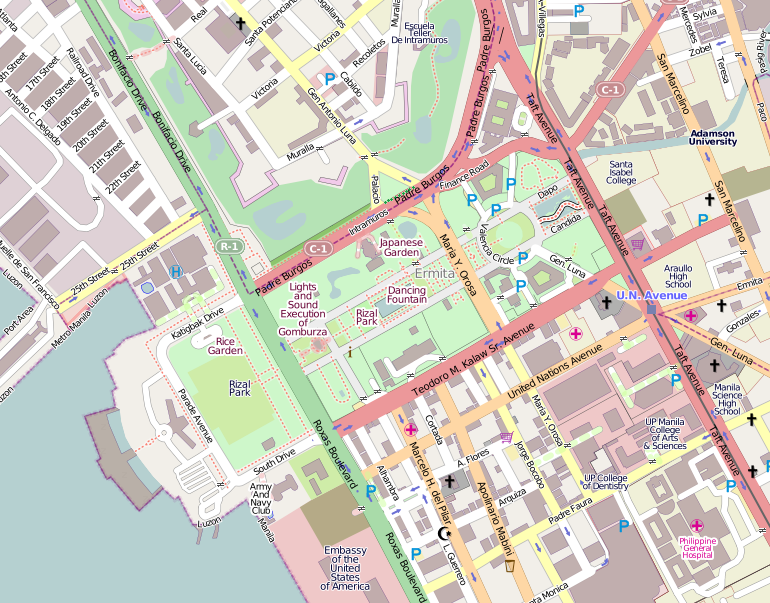
- Location within Rizal Park Location within Manila Location within Metro Manila Location within Luzon Location within Philippines
- Coordinates: 14°35′13″N 120°58′52″E
- Type: Art museum
- Public transit access: Central Terminal; United Nations; 6 17 Manila City Hall

National Museum of the Philippines
- National Museum of Fine Arts; National Museum of Anthropology; National Museum of Natural History; National Planetarium
- Building details
- Former names: Old Legislative Building; National Art Gallery

General information
- Status: Completed
- Architectural style: Neoclassical
- Location: Padre Burgos Avenue, Rizal Park, Manila, Philippines
- Construction started: 1918
- Completed: July 16, 1926
- Renovated: 1950
- Destroyed: February 1945 (rebuilt 1950)

Design and construction
- Architects: Ralph Harrington Doane; Antonio Manalac Toledo; Juan M. Arellano
- Civil engineer: Pedro Siochi
- Main contractor: Pedro Siochi and Company

The National Museum of Fine Arts (Filipino: Pambansang Museo ng Sining), formerly known as the National Art Gallery, is an art museum in Manila, Philippines. Located on Padre Burgos Avenue on the eastern side of Rizal Park, opposite the National Museum of Anthropology, it is owned and operated by the National Museum of the Philippines. Opened in 1998, the museum houses paintings and sculptures by prominent Filipino artists, including Juan Luna, Félix Resurrección Hidalgo, and Guillermo Tolentino.

The neoclassical building was completed in 1921 and originally housed the legislative bodies of the Philippine government. Commonly known as the Old Legislative Building (or the Old Congress Building), it served as the seat of the Congress of the Philippines from 1926 to 1972 and of the Senate of the Philippines from 1987 to 1997.

== History ==
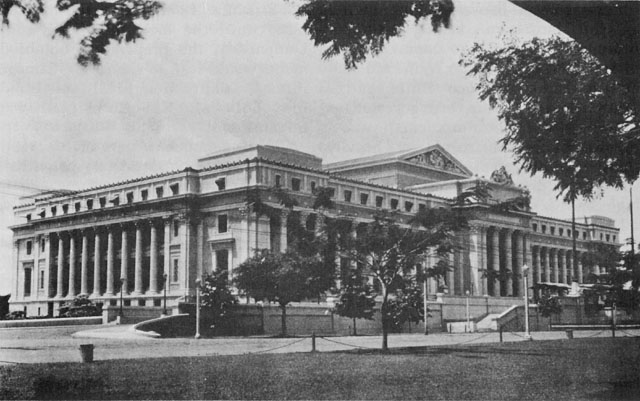
The Legislative Building during the 1930s

The building was originally designed by the Bureau of Public Works (precursor of the Department of Public Works and Highways) Consulting Architect Ralph Harrington Doane and Antonio Manalac Toledo in 1918, and was intended to be the future home of the National Library of the Philippines, according to the Plan of Manila of Daniel H. Burnham. Meanwhile, a Capitol building for the Philippine Legislature (established on October 16, 1916) was to rise on Wallace Field, just south of the library (the location is now María Y. Orosa Street in Rizal Park). Instead, the Philippine Legislature decided to move into the Library building in 1926, and changes to the building's layout were done accordingly by architect Juan M. Arellano. It was built under the supervision of the architecture firm of Pedro Siochi and Company and the building therefore became known as the Legislative Building. The Second Regular Session of the 7th Philippine Legislature was formally opened on the inauguration of the building on July 16, 1926, in the presence of Governor-General Leonard Wood, then Senate President Manuel L. Quezon, House Speaker Manuel Roxas, and Colonel Carmi A. Thompson, envoy of President Calvin Coolidge of the United States. It was concurrently the headquarters of the National Library from 1928 to 1944.

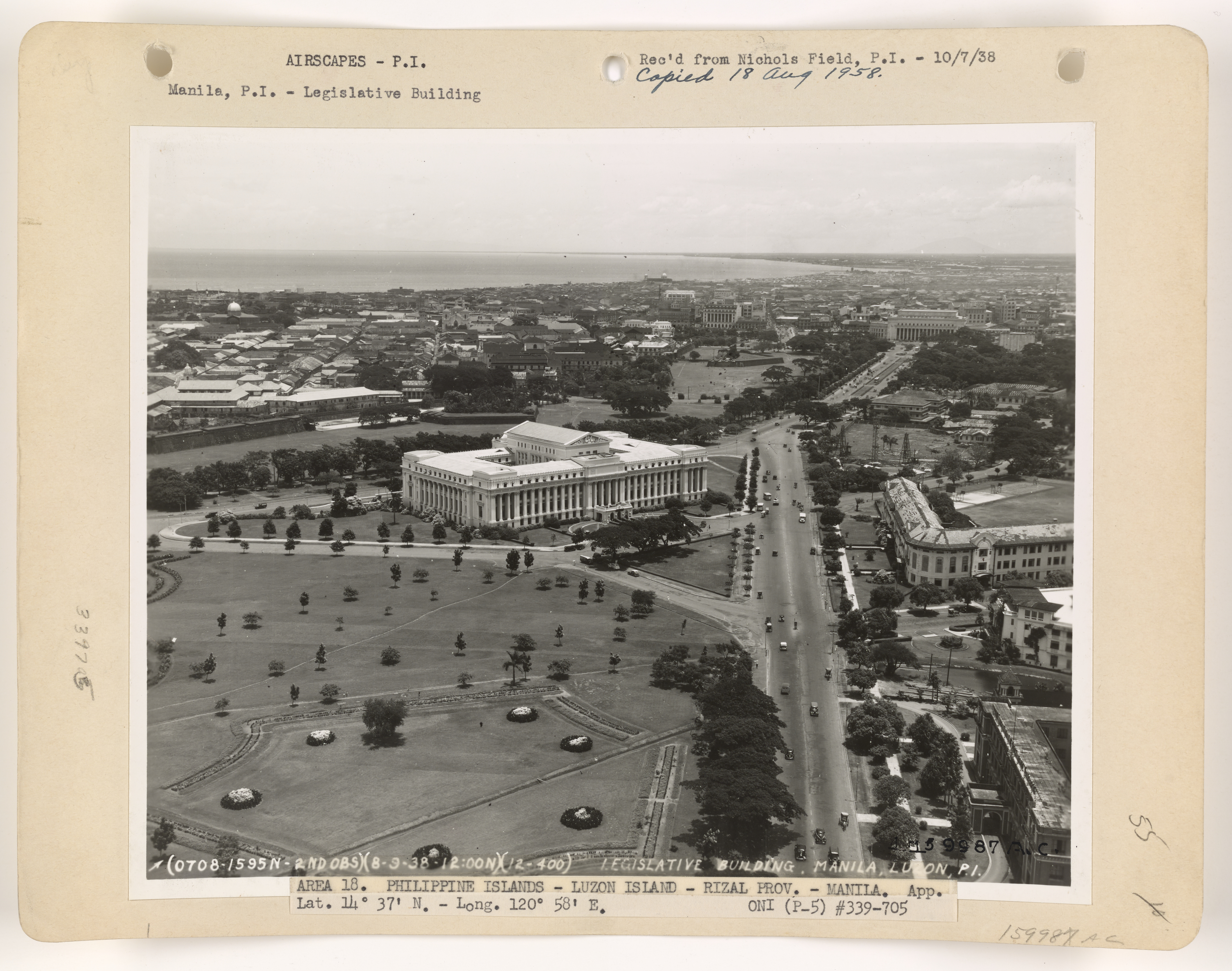
Aerial view of the Legislative Building, 1938

In 1935, the Commonwealth of the Philippines was proclaimed, and the inauguration of President Manuel L. Quezon was held outside the building. The building became home of the National Assembly of the Philippines, and it was subsequently known as the National Assembly Building. In 1940, the National Assembly was replaced by a bicameral Congress of the Philippines, consisting of a Senate and House of Representatives. The Senate occupied the upper floors while the House occupied the lower floors. The building would serve as home of the Commonwealth Congress until 1945.

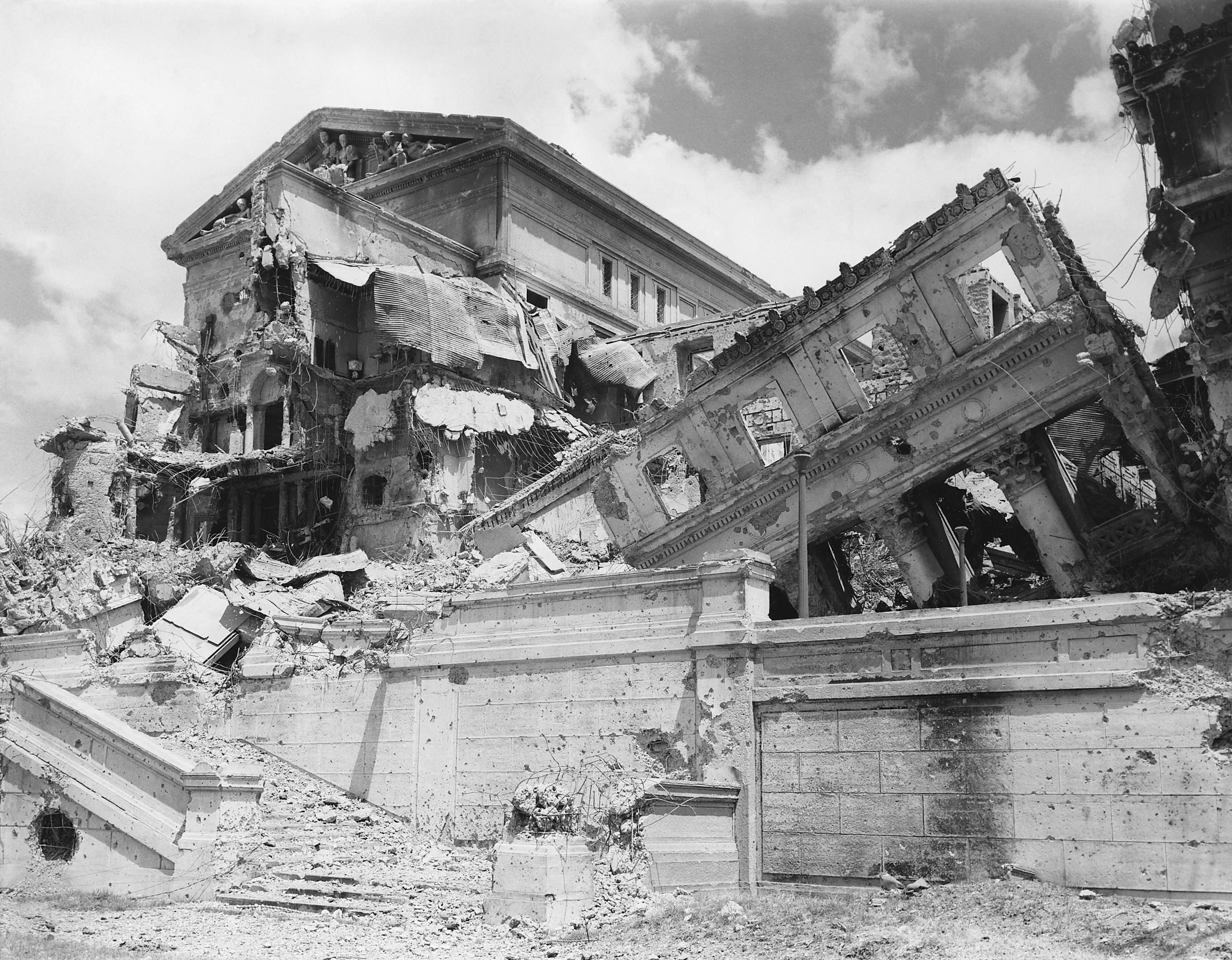
The destruction of the Legislative Building following a bombing campaign, c. 1943 – 1945

During World War II, American forces shelled the building during the Battle of Manila in 1945 to flush out Japanese forces who had turned it into a stronghold. Most of the structure was beyond repair, except for the still-standing central portion. With the inauguration of the Republic of the Philippines in 1946, the building was reconstructed to be the home of Congress. It was rebuilt by the U.S. Philippine War Damage Corporation to the same dimensions but with less interior and exterior ornamentation. Reconstruction began in 1949, while the Congress moved back the same year. The two wings of the building were completed in 1950. The building was rebuilt mostly from memory, with the aid of a few remaining blueprints.

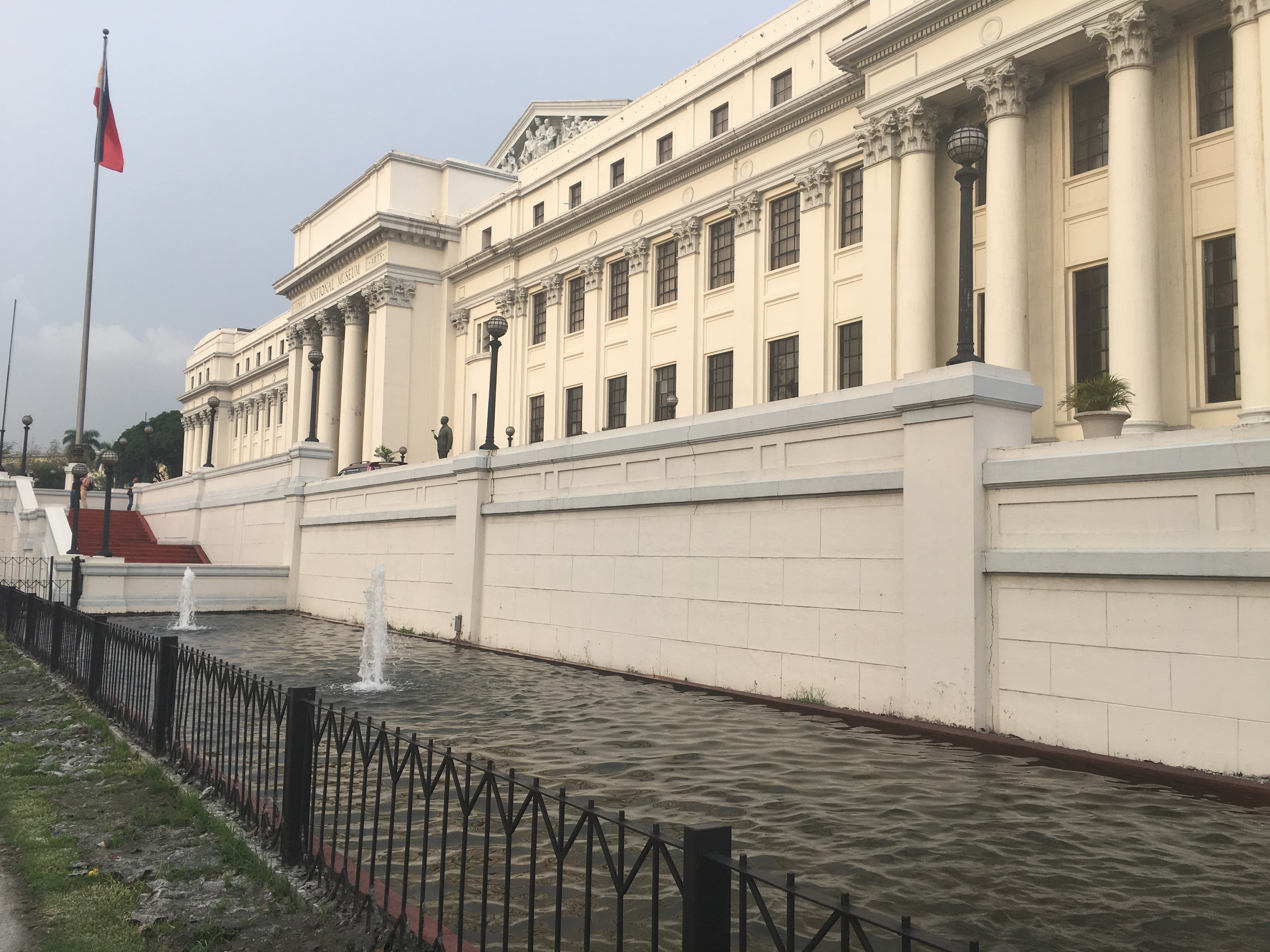
The Philippine National Museum (of Fine Arts)

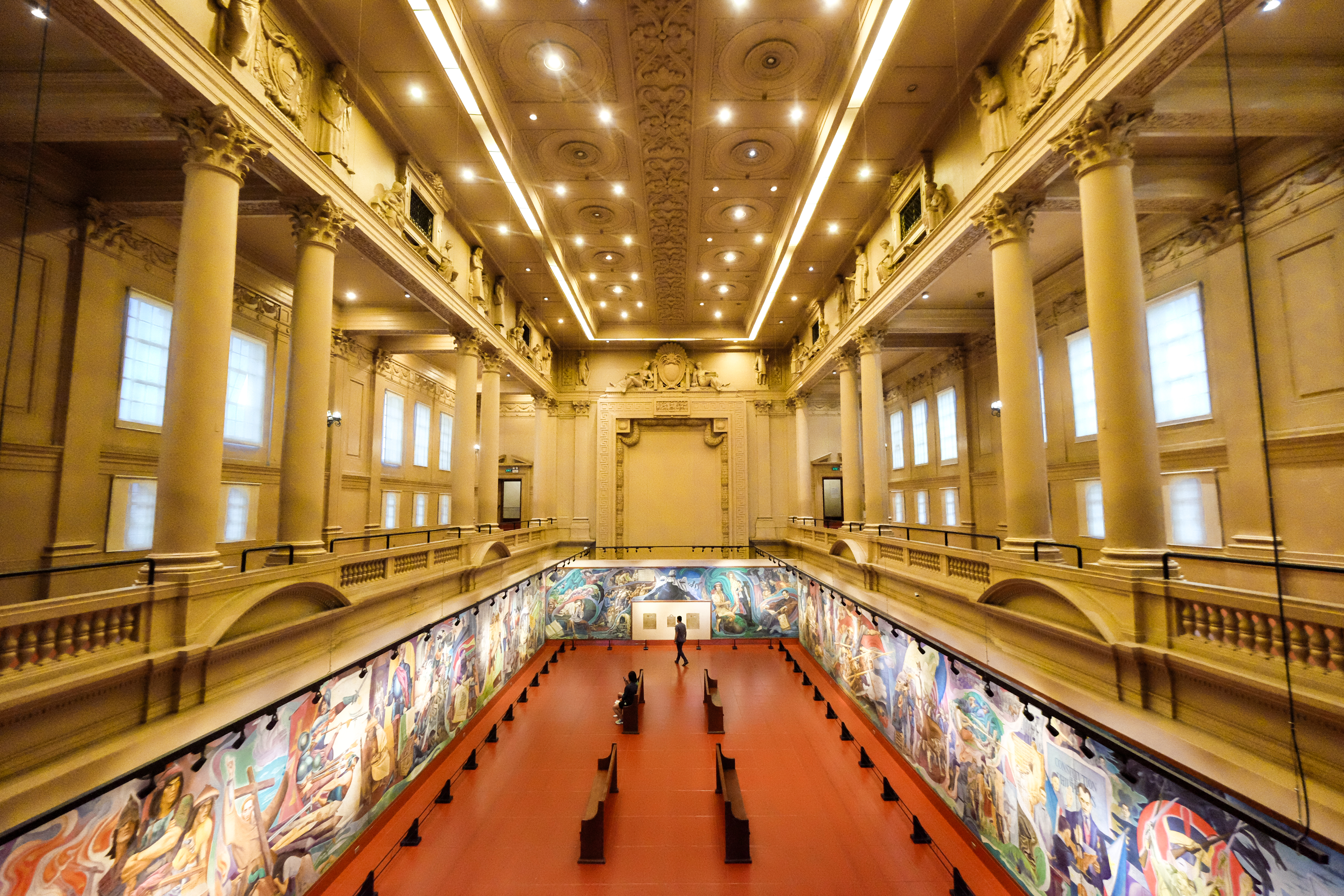
Senate Session Hall in 2022

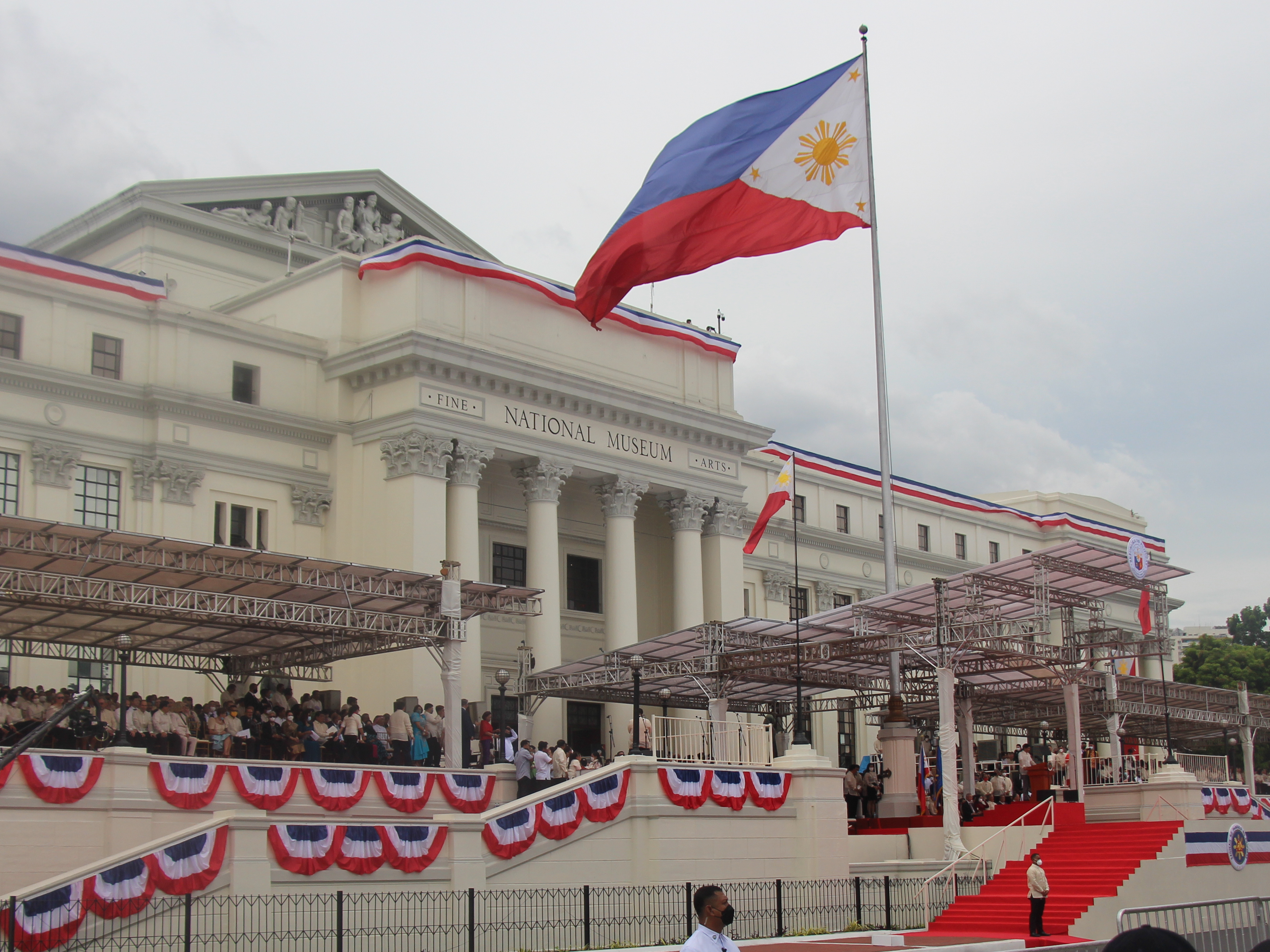
The museum was used as the venue for the inauguration of Bongbong Marcos on June 30, 2022.

The building became known as the Congress Building, and continuously served as home of the Congress of the Philippines until 1972 with the declaration of martial law. The Congress was effectively dissolved, and the building was padlocked. For a short time, the building became home of the offices of the Prime Minister of the Philippines, a position established under the 1973 Constitution of the Philippines, on the fourth floor, the Ombudsman on the third floor, the National Museum on the second floor, and the Sandiganbayan on the ground floor. The building was called the Executive House for the duration of that time.

The Congress of the Philippines was reestablished with the ratification of the 1987 Constitution of the Philippines. While the House of Representatives moved to the Batasang Pambansa Complex in Constitution Hill, Quezon City, the Senate used the original Congress Building for their plenary sessions.

The Senate would use the Congress Building until May 1997, when it moved to the Government Service Insurance System Building on reclaimed land on Manila Bay in Pasay. The former office of the Prime Minister was taken as the Office of the Vice President.

The building was then turned over to the National Museum of the Philippines in 1998.

On September 30, 2010, the National Historical Commission of the Philippines declared the building as a "National Historical Landmark" by virtue of Resolution No. 8 (dated September 30, 2010). A marker commemorating the declaration was unveiled on October 29, 2010.

== Collections ==
The museum contains a number of important works, including:

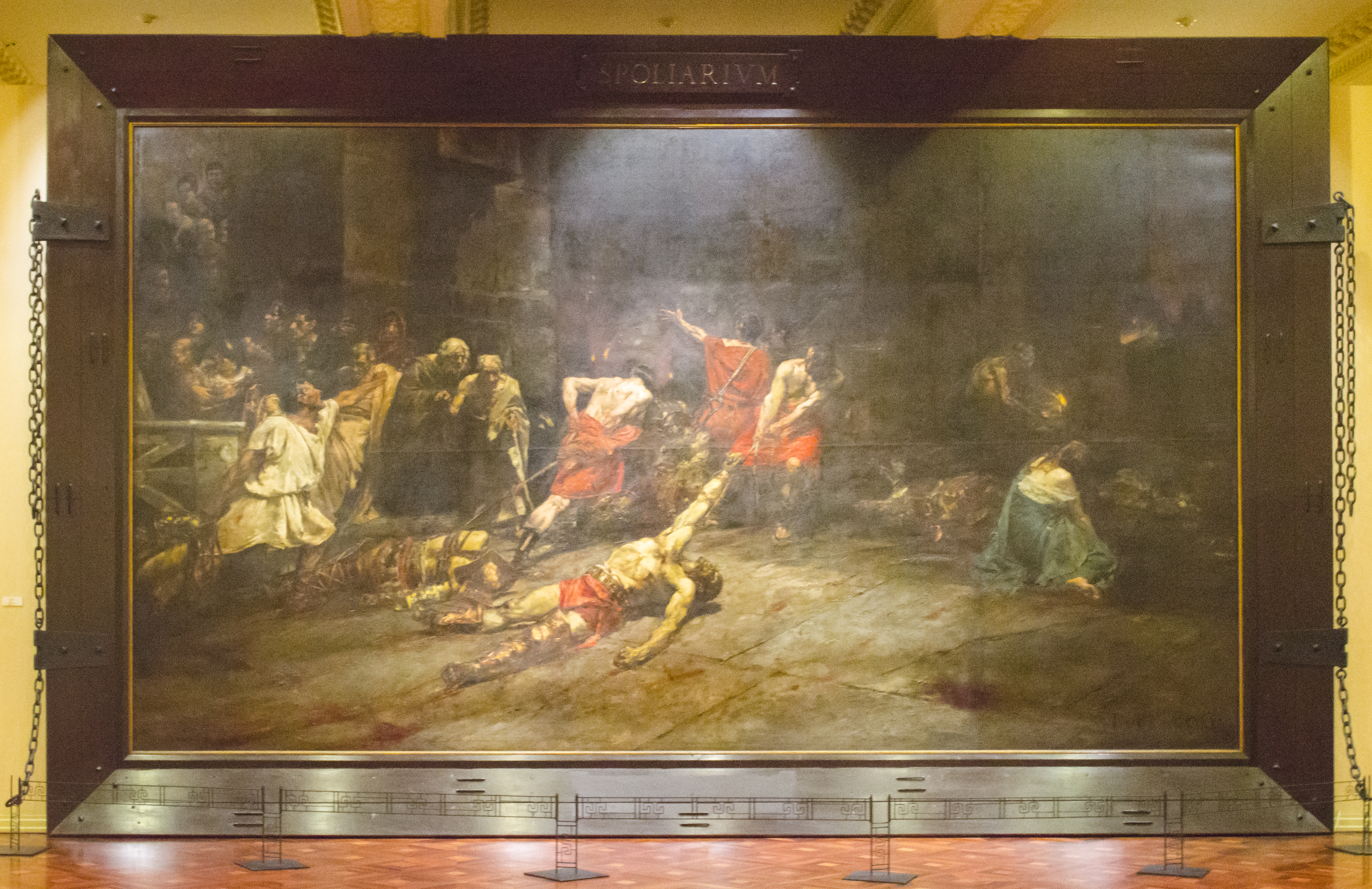
Spoliarium; by Juan Luna; 1884; oil on canvas; 4.22 m × 7.675 m

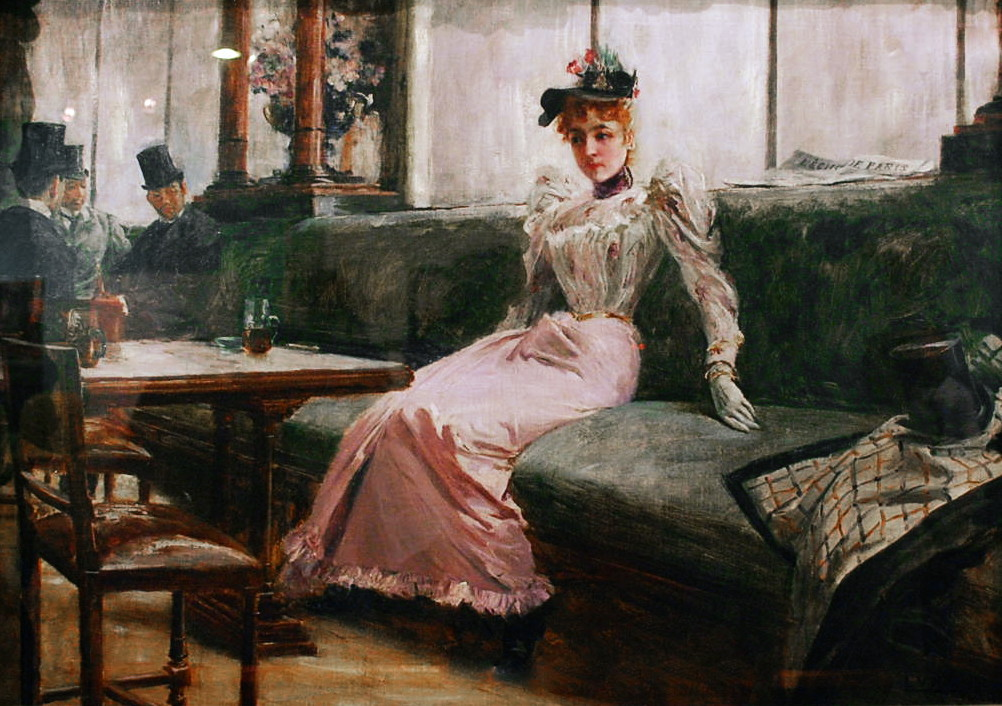
The Parisian Life; by Juan Luna; 1892; oil on canvas; 57 cm × 79 cm

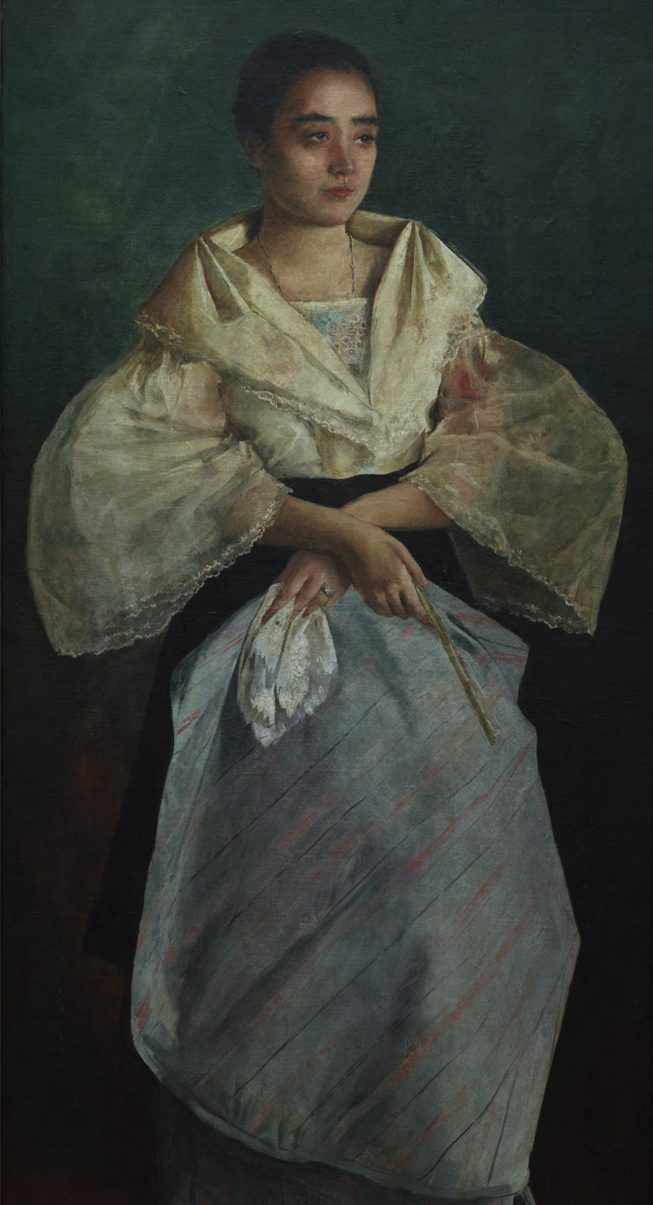
La Bulaqueña; by Juan Luna; 1895

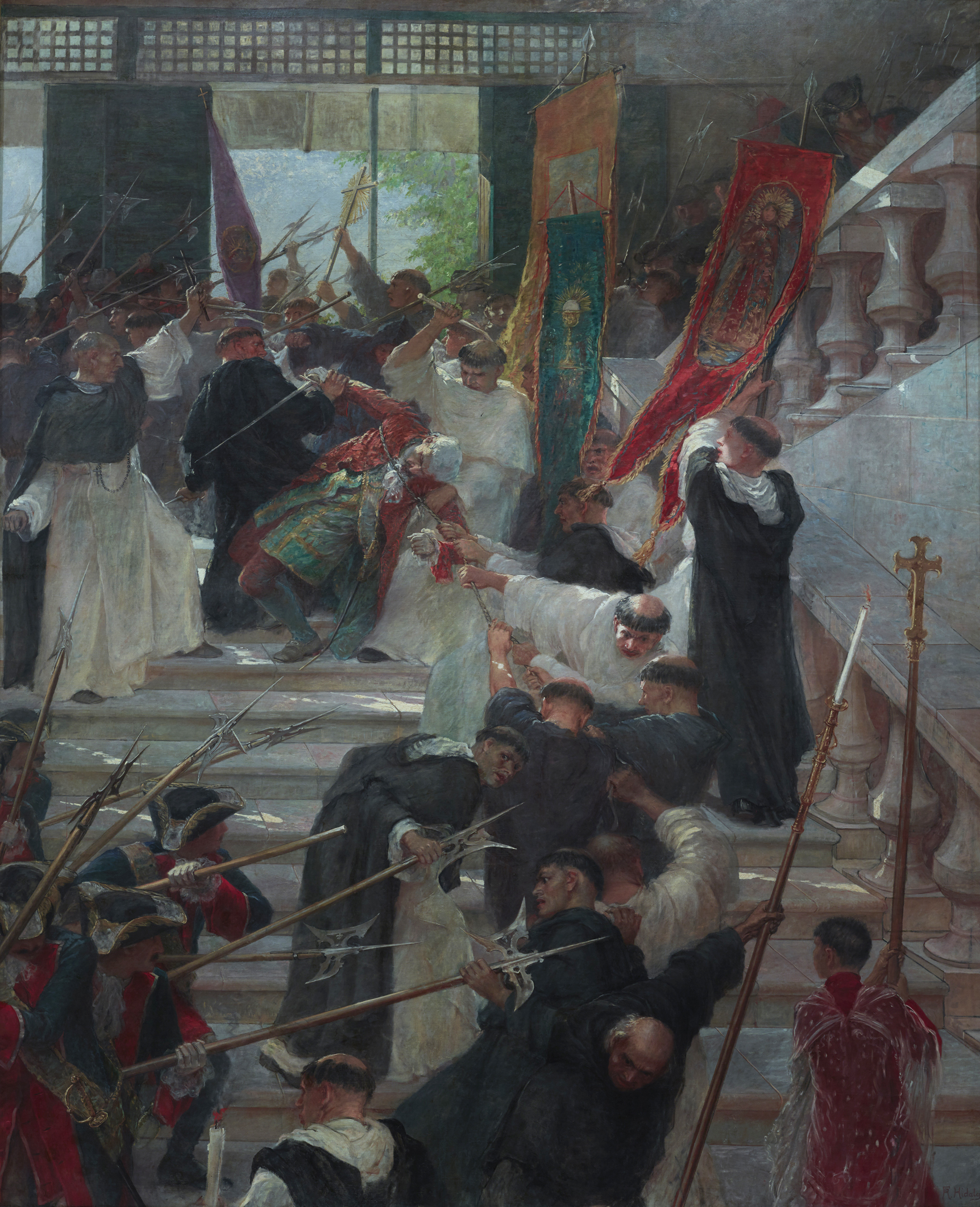
Assassination of Governor Bustamante and His Son; by Félix Resurrección Hidalgo; c. 1904

National Fine Arts Collection

- Juan Luna y Novicio: Spoliarium
- Félix Resurrección Hidalgo: El asesinato del Gobernador Bustamante (The Assassination of Governor Bustamante)
- Juan Luna y Novicio: Una Bulaqueña
- Simón Flores y de la Rosa: Alimentando Pollos (Feeding Chickens)

Other collections

- Carlos Villaluz Francisco: Filipino Struggles Through History; collection of the Government of the City of Manila
- Vicente Silva Manansala: The International Rice Research Institute (IRRI) series; collection of IRRI
- Juan Luna y Novicio: Interieure d’un Café (Parisian Life); collection of GSIS
- Carlos Villaluz Francisco: Progress of Medicine in the Philippines (Panel I–IV); collection of the Philippine General Hospital
- Vicente Silva Manansala: Mga Manok (Chickens); collection of AIA Philippines
- Vicente Silva Manansala: Mga Magsasaka (Farmers)
- Vicente Silva Manansala: Ang Pamilya sa Oras ng Pagkain (A Family at Mealtime)
- Vicente Silva Manansala: Mga Manunugtog (Musicians)
- Vicente Silva Manansala: Handaan (Feast)
- Vicente Silva Manansala: Mga Isda (Fishes)
- Vicente Silva Manansala: Mga Kalabaw (Carabaos)

== See also ==
- List of national galleries
