= Spanish colonial bridges in Tayabas =

Historical bridges in Tayabas, Philippines

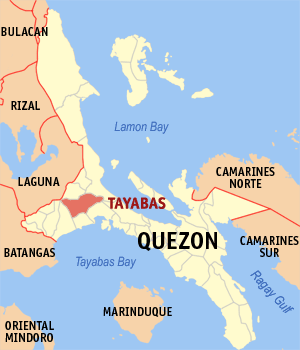
Map of Tayabas in Quezon province

The Spanish colonial bridges in Tayabas are bridges built during the Spanish-colonial era in Tayabas, Quezon. The city government of Tayabas declared eleven bridges in the city as Historical bridges of Tayabas for protection purposes. These are the bridges of Alitao, Isabel II, Urbiztondo, Don Francisco de Asis, Bai, Despedidas, Ese, Princesa, Malagonlong, Lakawan and Mate. In 2011, ten bridges in Tayabas were declared as National Cultural Treasure under the Historic Bridges of Tayabas. The declared national cultural treasures under the list are the bridges of Alitao, Isabel II, Don Francisco de Asis, Gibanga, Malagonlong, Lakawan, Mate, Ese, Despedida, Tumuloy and Princesa.

== Tayabas Historic Bridges ==
The Tayabas Historic Bridges is a group of existing Spanish-colonial era bridges in Tayabas, Quezon declared by the National Museum of the Philippines as a National Cultural Treasure on August 12, 2011.

Also declared as a National Historical Landmark by the National Historical Commission of the Philippines

Image	Bridge	Location	Coordinates	Description
	Puente de Alitao	Alitao River, Poblacion	14°01′34″N 121°35′25″E	A two arched adobe bridge built in 1793 by Don Diego Urbano. It is the earliest surviving colonial bridge in Tayabas.
	Puente de Reina Isabel II	Iyam River, Brgy. Baguio	14°00′36″N 121°34′52″E	The bridge was constructed under the term of Gobernador Don Jose Maria de la O in March 15, 1852. It was finished in July 16, 1853 and was dedicated to Queen Isabel II of Spain.
	Puente de San Francisco de Asís	Domoit River, Brgy. Domoit	13°58′06″N 121°32′56″E	Built in 1854
	Puente de Gibanga	Brgy. Gibanga		
	Puente de Malogonlong	Dumacaa River, Brgy Matuena	14°00′47″N 121°37′01″E	The longest Spanish colonial era bridge in the Philippines built by Franciscan Fr. Antonio Mateos from 1841 to 1850
	Puente de Lakawan	Lakawan River, Brgy. Lakawan	14°00′29″N 121°37′42″E	
	Puente de Mate	Mate River, Brgy. Mate	14°00′18″N 121°38′02″E	
	Puente de la Ese	Ibiyang Munti, Brgy. Camaysao	14°02′12″N 121°35′01″E	
	Puente de las Despedidas	Malaking Ibiya, Brgy. Lalo	14°05′10″N 121°34′16″E	
	Puente de Tumuloy			
	Puente de la Princesa	Ilayang Dumacaa (Upper Dumacaa), Brgy. Matuena	14°03′55″N 121°34′20″E	

== Other Spanish-colonial era bridges ==
Besides the declaration of the National Museum on National Cultural Treasures and the city government of Tayabas on historic bridges, all Spanish colonial era bridges are declared cultural properties (part of the Philippine Registry of Cultural Property) under the National Cultural Heritage Act.

Part of the declared historic bridges by the city government of Tayabas

Image	Bridge	Location	Coordinates	Description
	Puente de Baawin	136.55 Kilometer Post	14°01′15″N 121°35′14″E	
	Puente de Baguio	Brgy. Baguio	14°00′57″N 121°35′05″E	
	Puente de Bai	Bai Creek, Brgy. Dapdap	14°03′46″N 121°33′25″E	
	Puente de Calumpang	Tayabas-Sariaya Provincial Road, Brgy. Calumpang	13°59′09″N 121°33′48″E	
	Puentecito de Malao-a	Brgy. Malao-a	14°00′28″N 121°34′42″E	
	Puentecito de Putol	Brgy. Putol	13°59′51″N 121°34′16″E	
	Puente de Ubli		14°01′20″N 121°35′16″E	
	Puente de Urbiztondo	Malao-a River, Barangay Malao-a	14°00′20″N 121°34′52″E	Built in 1854

== See also ==
- Puente de España
- Jones Bridge
- Bridge of Isabel II

== Sources ==
- "The Spanish Era Colonial Bridges of Tayabas". National Museum of the Philippines. July 7, 2022. Archived from the original on December 5, 2023.
