= Malagonlong Bridge =

Historic bridge in Quezon, Philippines

Malagonlong Bridge Tulay ng Malagonlong (Filipino)
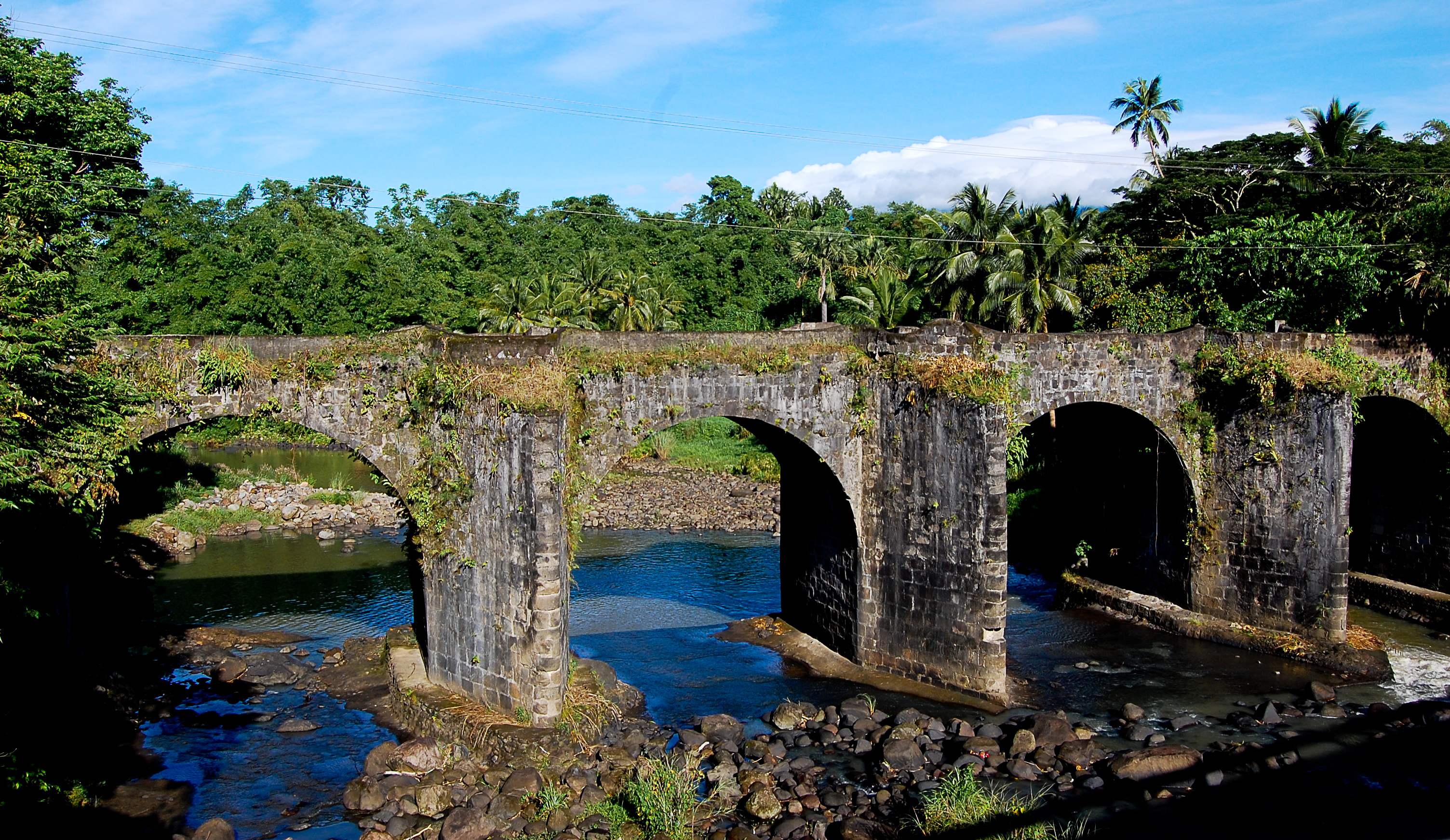
- The bridge in 2011
- Coordinates: 14°00′47″N 121°37′01″E
- Carries: Tayabas–Mauban Road (old segment)
- Crosses: Dumaca River
- Locale: Tayabas, Quezon
- Other name: Puente de Malagonlong (Spanish)
- Maintained by: Tayabas City Government
- Heritage status: National Cultural Treasure under the Historic Bridges of Tayabas

Characteristics
- Design: Arch bridge
- Material: Adobe stone, Limestone and Molasses
- Total length: 445 ft (136 m)
- No. of spans: Five

History
- Architect: Fray Antonio Mateos
- Constructed by: People of Tayabas
- Construction start: 1841
- Opened: 1850
- Closed: 2004

Location
- Interactive map of Malagonlong Bridge

The Malagonlong Bridge (Spanish: Puente de Malagonlong) and (Filipino: Tulay ng Malagonlong) is a five-span 445 ft (136 m) long stone arch bridge built during the Spanish colonial period in Tayabas, Quezon, Philippines. The bridge is known as one of the oldest bridges as well as the longest bridge made during the Spanish era. It was declared a National Cultural Treasure under the Historic Bridges of Tayabas on August 12, 2011.

== Location ==
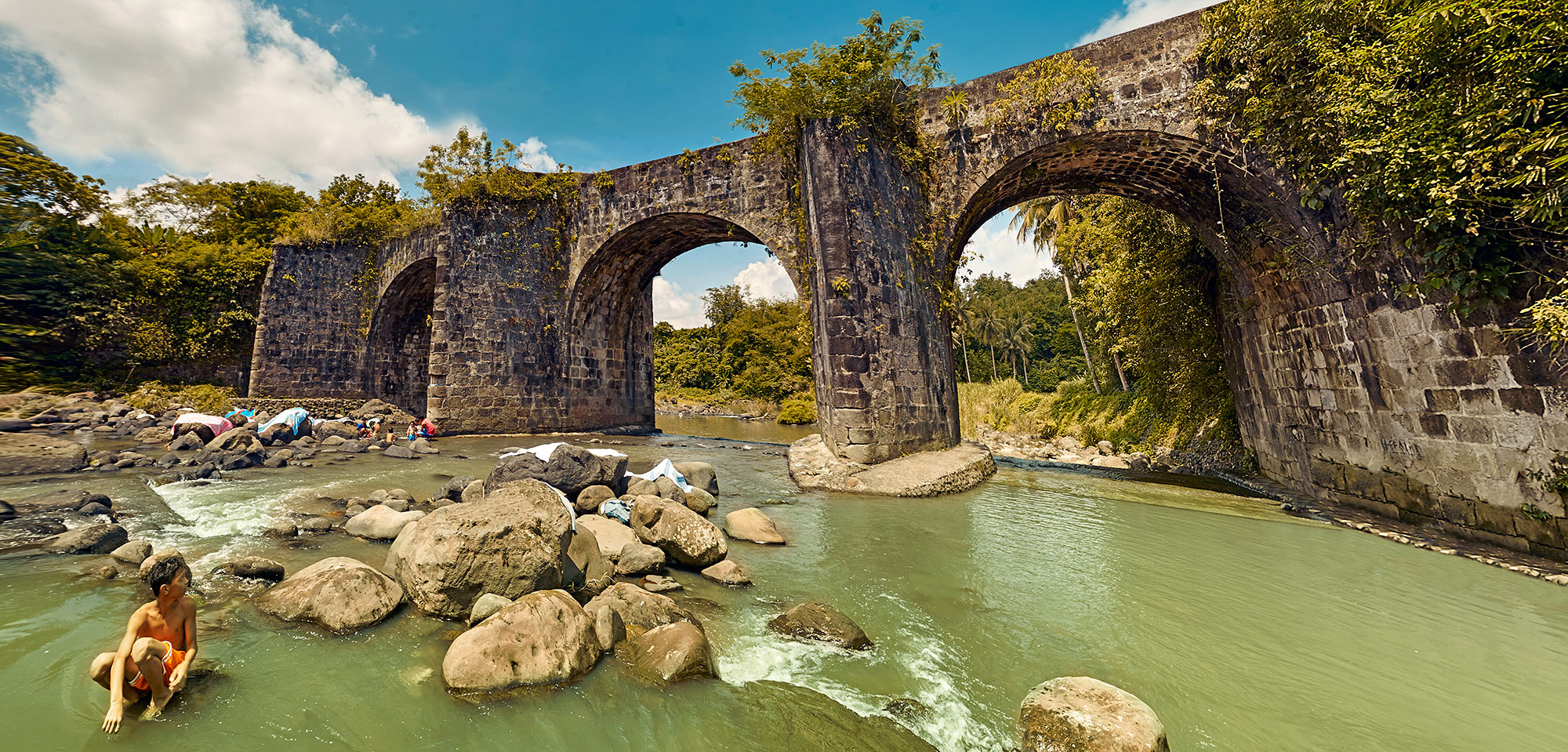
Malagong Bridge of Tayabas

The Malagonlong Bridge crosses the Dumacaa River and connects Barangay Mateuna and Lakawan to the eastern side of Tayabas, as well as the municipalities of Mauban and Pagbilao. It carried the old segment of Tayabas–Mauban Road.

== Description ==
The stone arch bridge has a total length of 445 ft (136 m). The first arch has both height and width of 36 ft (11 m); the second arch also has a height and width of 33 ft (10 m); the fourth arch has a width of 30 ft (9.1 m) and the fifth arch has a width of 18 ft (5.5 m). The bridge has a carriageway of about 6 m (20 ft) and six small balconies where pedestrians can stop by.

It became a bridge for tourists rather than for vehicular traffic after a new bridge was built parallel to it in 2004. It is currently owned and managed by the local government unit of Tayabas.

== History ==
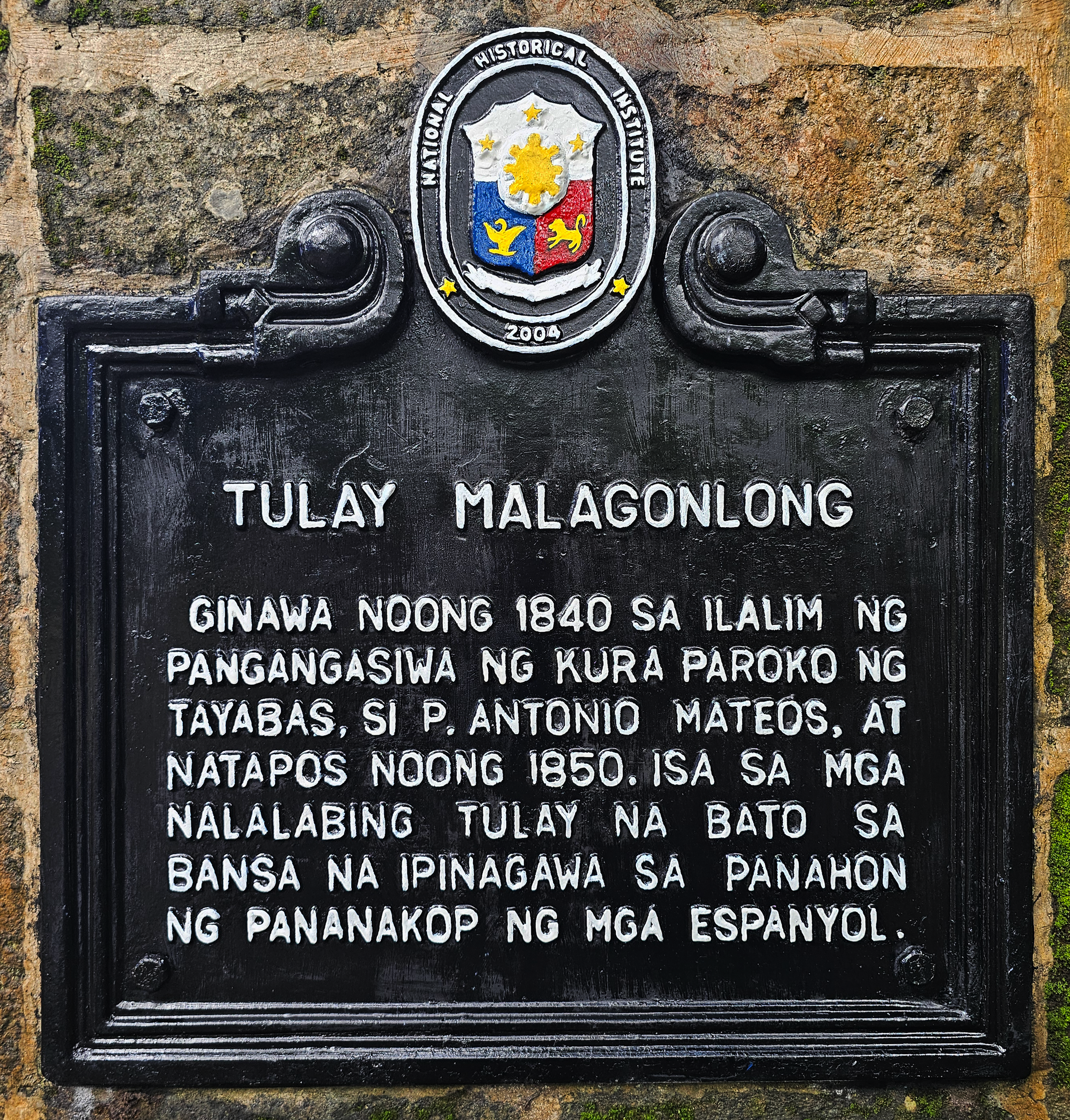
Bridge NHI historical marker

The bridge was built between the years 1840 and 1850 under the direction of the Fray Antonio Mateos, a Franciscan priest who served as the Ministro del Pueblo of Tayabas. In an account of a Spanish traveler Juan Alvarez Guerra, the bridge was built in 1841 under Gobernadorcillo Don Joaquin Ortega's term. The bridge was made by the people of Tayabas through forced labor. It is estimated that 100,000 adobe blocks was used to build the bridge. An inscription on the bridge indicates that it was inaugurated in 1850 under the term of Gobernadorcillo Don Julian S. Francisco. According to historical records, Filipino locals built the bridge for 10 years instead of paying taxes to the Spanish colonial government. It also carried a section of the modern Tayabas–Mauban Road, which formed part of the national road linking Manila with southern Luzon provinces until the route was realigned via Lucena after the provincial capital moved there in 1901. The bridge was closed in 2004 with the construction of a new concrete bridge running parallel to it.

The bridge was declared by the National Historical Institute (now National Historical Commission of the Philippines) as a marked historical structure by placing a historical marker. In 2010, the local government of the municipality of Tayabas declared the eleven historical bridges of Tayabas, including Malagonlong Bridge, a historical bridge for protection purposes.

== See also ==
- Spanish colonial bridges in Tayabas
- Puente de España
- Jones Bridge
- Bridge of Isabel II
