= Jones Bridge =

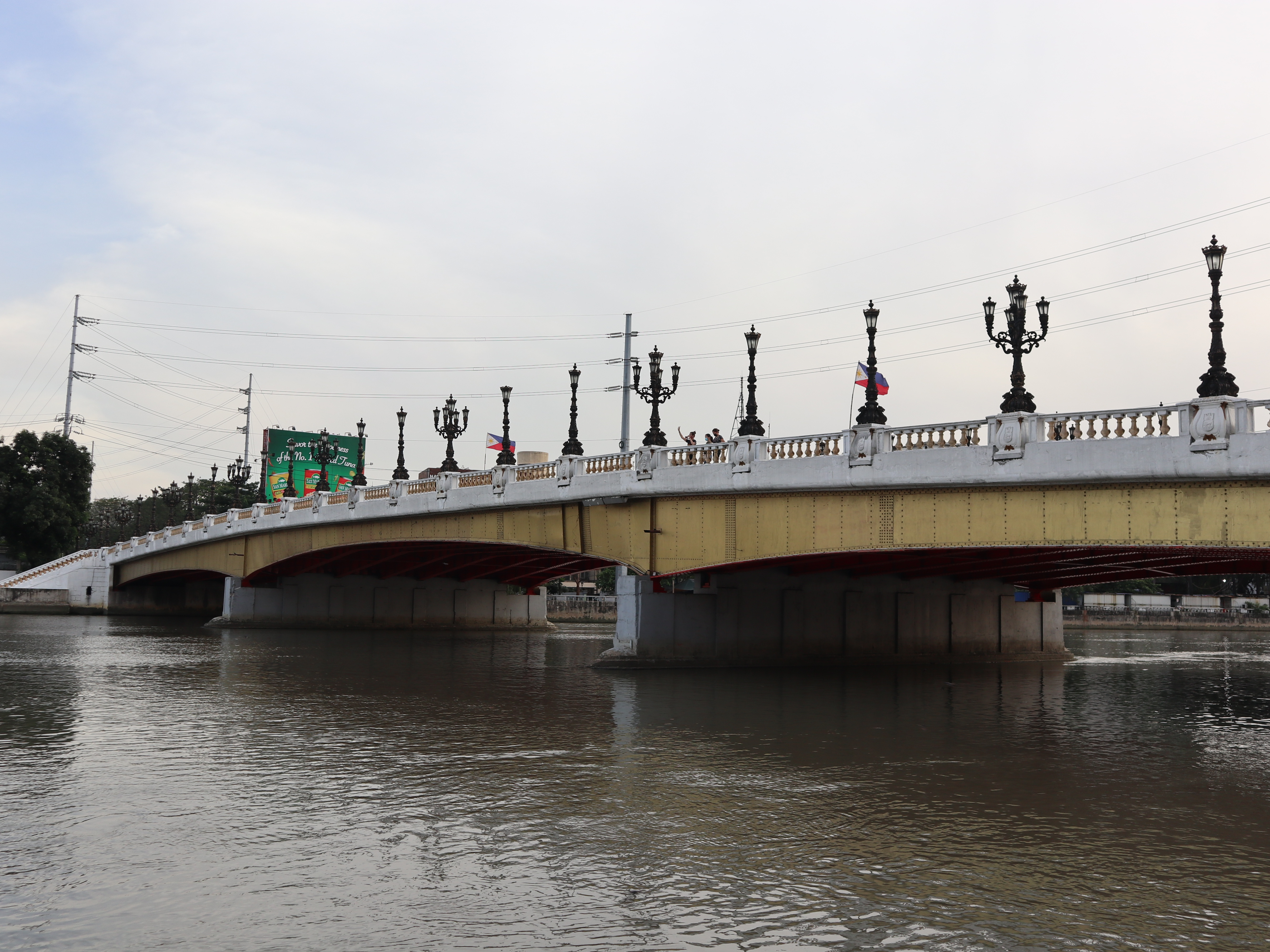
- The bridge in 2021
- Coordinates: 14°35′45″N 120°58′38.3″E
- Carried: Motor vehicles, pedestrians and bicycles
- Crossed: Pasig River
- Locale: Manila, Philippines
- Official name: William A. Jones Memorial Bridge
- Other name: Banzai Bridge (c. 1942)
- Named for: William Atkinson Jones
- Maintained by: City Government of Manila; Department of Public Works and Highways - North Manila District Engineering Office
- Preceded by: Binondo–Intramuros Bridge
- Followed by: MacArthur Bridge

Characteristics
- Design: Neoclassical arch bridge (1919–45); Girder bridge (1945–present)
- Material: Steel-reinforced concrete
- Total length: 115 m (377 ft)
- Width: 16.70 m (54.8 ft)
- Traversable?: Yes
- Longest span: 300 m (984 ft)
- No. of spans: 3
- Piers in water: 2
- Load limit: 20 t (20,000 kg)
- Clearance below: 7.5 m (25 ft) at mean tide
- No. of lanes: 4 (2 per direction)

History
- Designer: Juan M. Arellano (1919–20)
- Constructed by: City Government of Manila (1919–20) Philippine Bureau of Public Works (1920, 1945) U.S. Bureau of Public Roads (1945)
- Construction start: 1919
- Construction end: 1920
- Inaugurated: 1921
- Rebuilt: 1946
- Collapsed: February 1945
- Replaced: Puente de España

Location
- Interactive map of Jones Bridge

The William A. Jones Memorial Bridge, commonly known as the Jones Bridge, is an arched girder bridge that spans the Pasig River in Manila, Philippines. It is named after the United States legislator William Atkinson Jones, who served as the chairman of the U.S. Insular Affairs House Committee, which had previously exercised jurisdiction over the Philippines and was the principal author of the Jones Law that gave the country legislative autonomy from the United States. Built to replace the historic Puente de España (Bridge of Spain) in the 1910s, the bridge connects Quintin Paredes Road in the Binondo district to Padre Burgos Avenue in the Ermita district.

Originally designed by Filipino architect Juan M. Arellano using French Neoclassical architecture, the first incarnation of the bridge features three arches resting on two heavy piers, adorned by faux-stone and concrete ornaments, as well as four sculptures on concrete plinths allegorically representing motherhood and nationhood. The original bridge was destroyed during World War II by retreating Japanese troops and was reconstructed in 1946 by the U.S. and Philippine public works. The reconstructed bridge retained the three arches and two piers but removed all the ornaments. The bridge was first partially restored in 1998. In 2019, the City Government of Manila began a rehabilitation project to "restore" the Jones Bridge to its near-original design using Beaux-Arts architecture similar to that of Pont Alexandre III in Paris and the return of the three extant La Madre Filipina sculptures (the 4th requiring reconstruction).

== History ==
=== First Jones Bridge (1919–1945) ===
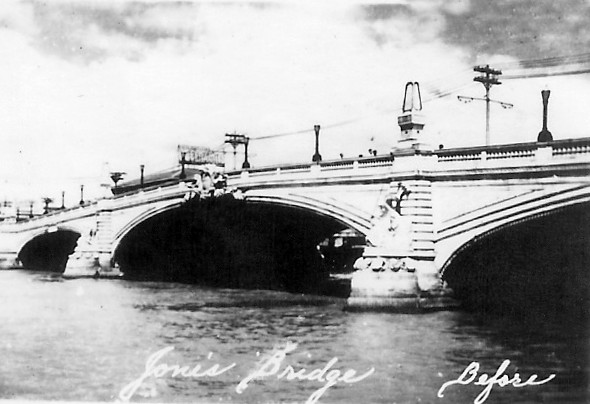
The original design of Jones Bridge

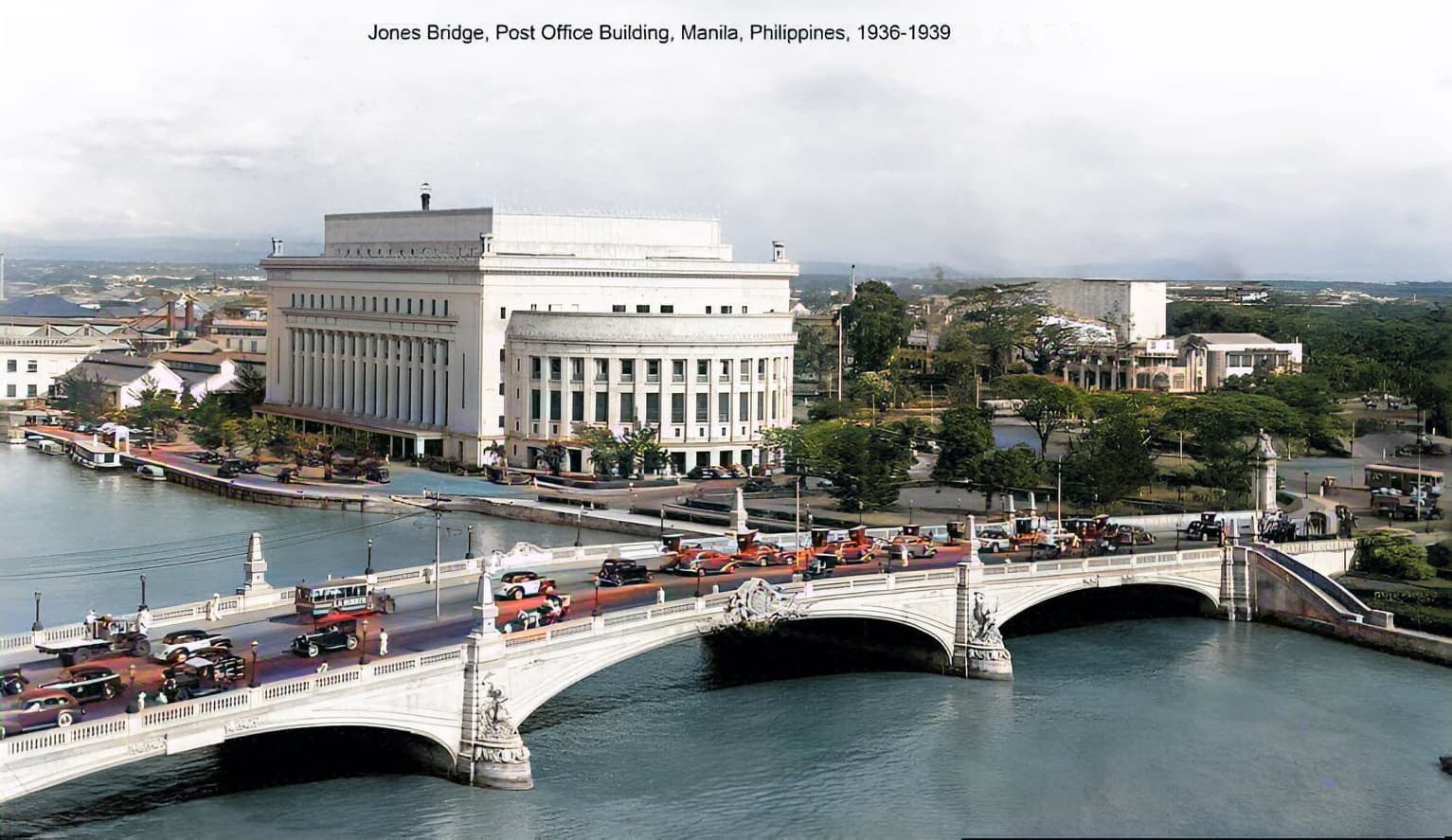
The bridge in the 1930s

The Jones Bridge was originally commissioned under the auspices of the City Government of Manila in 1919, before the Insular Government, through the Philippine Bureau of Public Works, later took over in finishing the bridge's construction in 1920. The bridge was intended to replace the Puente de España (Bridge of Spain), the first bridge built to cross the Pasig River constructed during the Spanish colonial era and the last incarnation of bridges that span the same location since 1630. It collapsed during the heavy rains of September 1914 that weakened the central pier, resulting in the middle span of the bridge collapsing. The Puente, located one block upstream at Calle Nueva (now E.T. Yuchengco Street), was temporarily kept open using a temporary truss bridge as the new bridge was being constructed at Calle Rosario (now Quintin Paredes Street).

The construction of new bridges was part of a master plan of Manila. Daniel Burnham, who wanted to emphasize the city's rivers and liken them to the Seine River in Paris and the canals of Venice. This plan was heavily implemented and supervised by William E. Parsons. However, upon the passage of the Jones Law, which gave the country autonomy from the United States, Filipino architect Juan M. Arellano took over and finished the bridge's final design. William Atkinson Jones, the author of such law, died in 1918 while the bridge was still being planned, and the Filipinos named the passageway after him.

Arellano designed the bridge in the style of the passageways constructed during Haussmann's renovation of Paris. He embellished the piers with statues of boys on dolphins, similar to those on the Pont Alexandre III at the Seine (which he had previously visited). Like the Parisian Pont, he marked both ends of the bridge with four plinths. Arellano commissioned a sculptor named Martinez to build four statues called La Madre Filipina (The Philippine Motherland), which would be placed on the pedestals.

Pre-war Jones bridge Architectural details

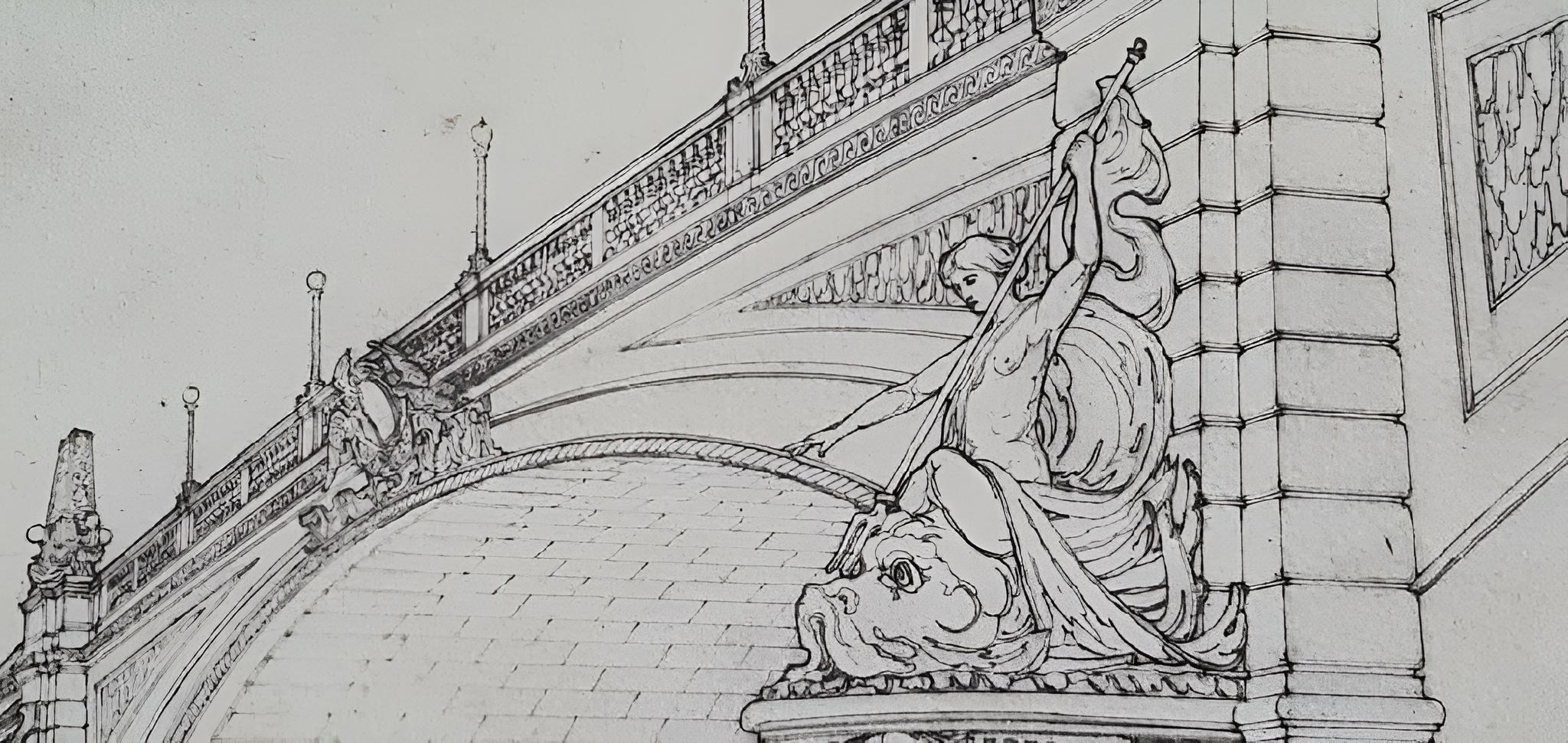
Architectural sketch by Arellano

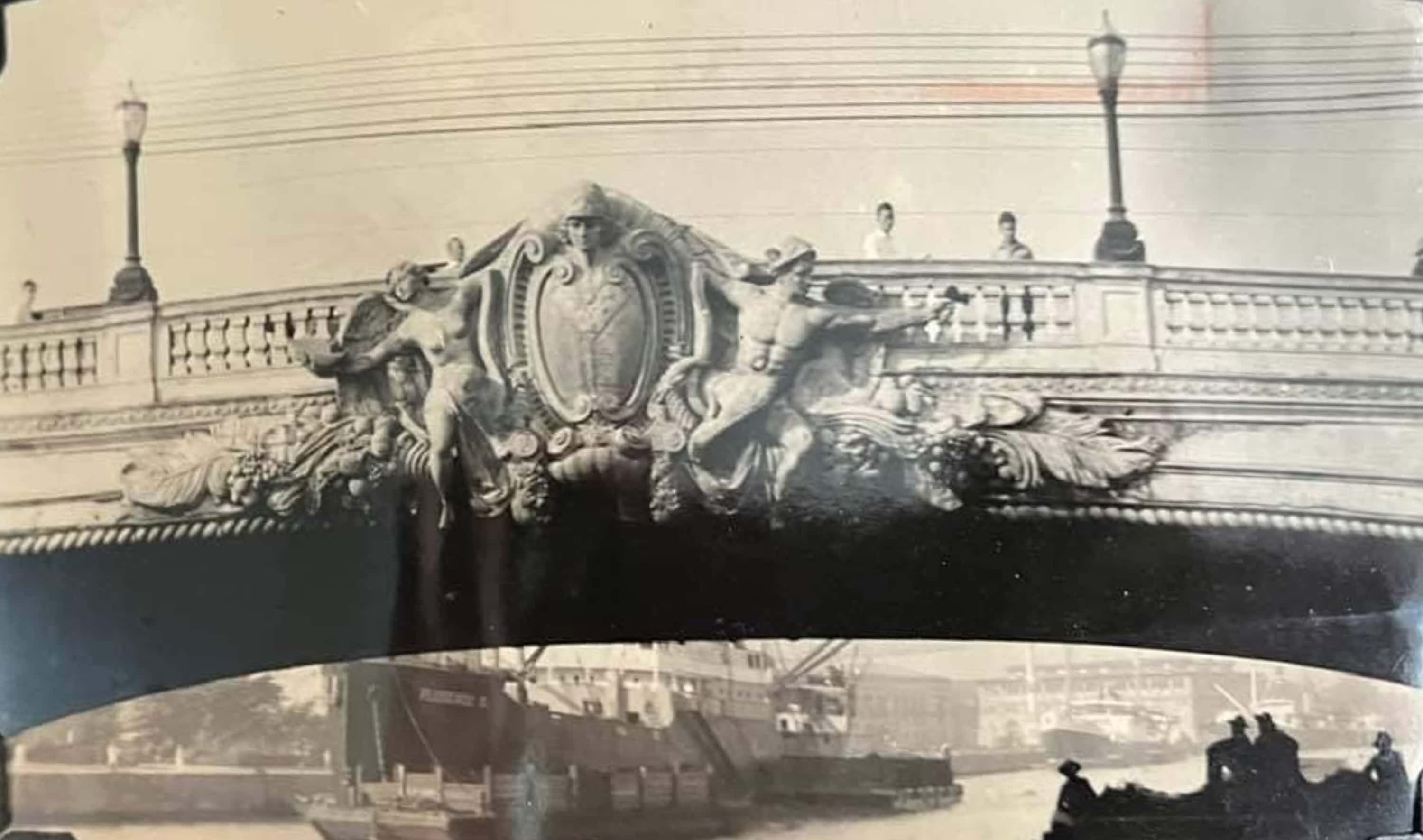
Center ornamental sculptures

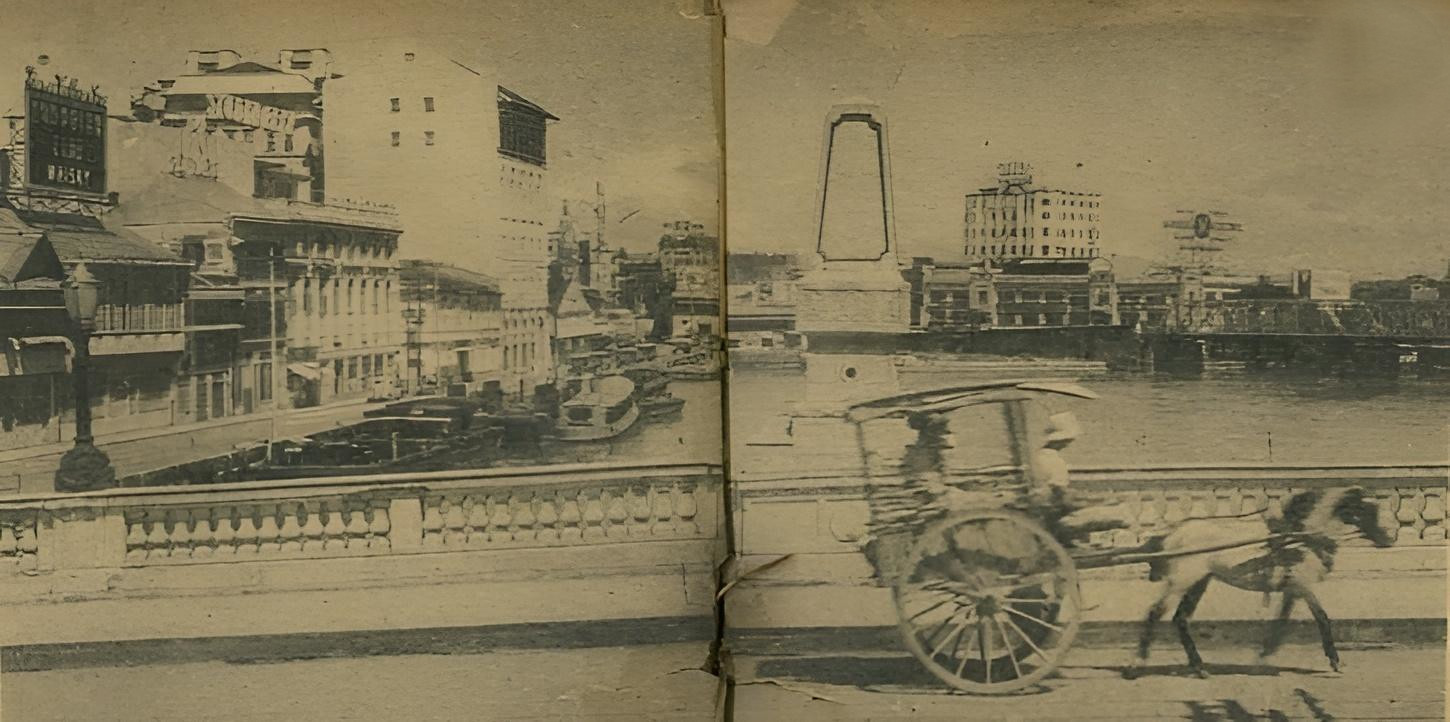
View from the bridge road

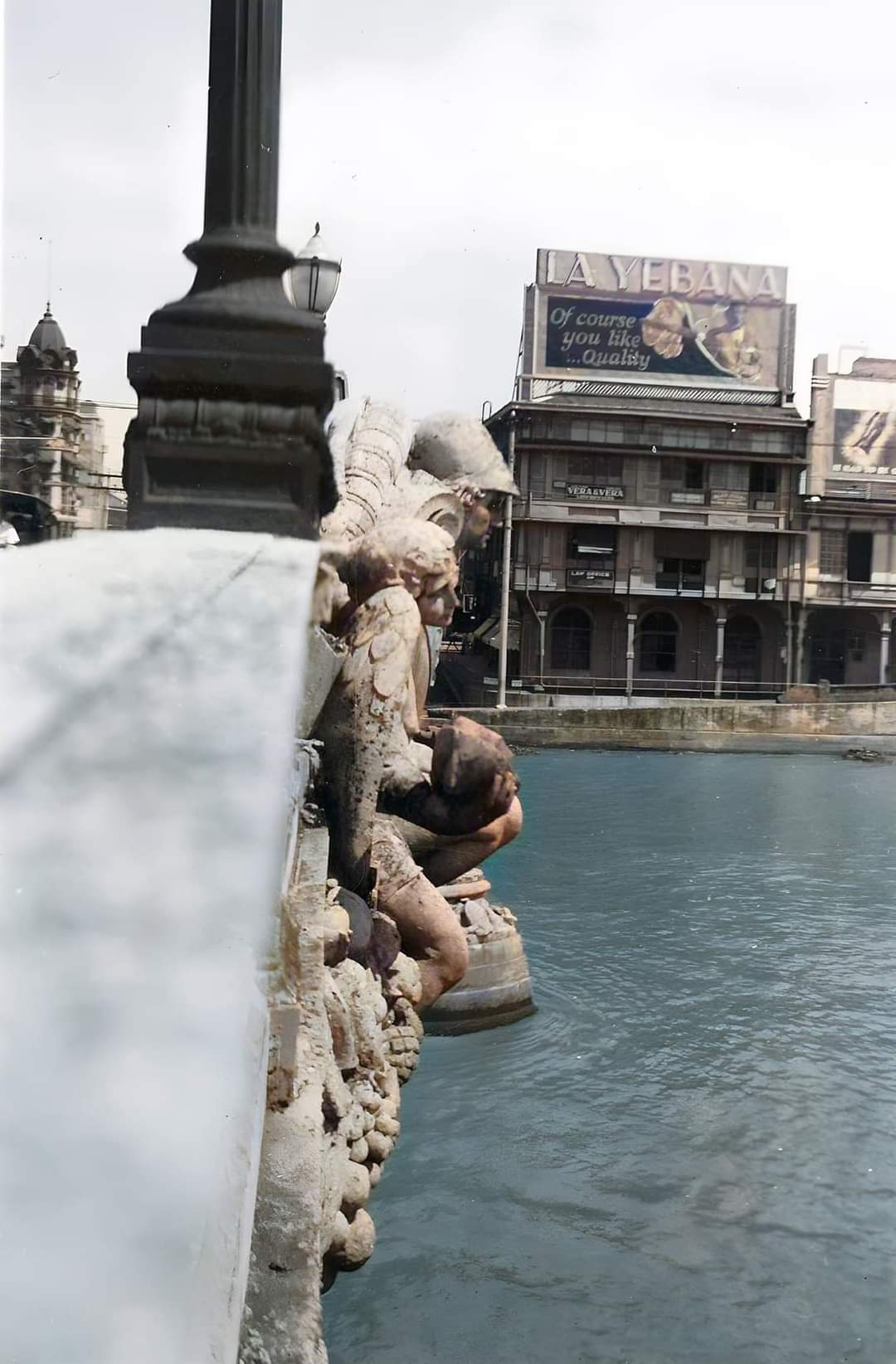
Center sculpture side view

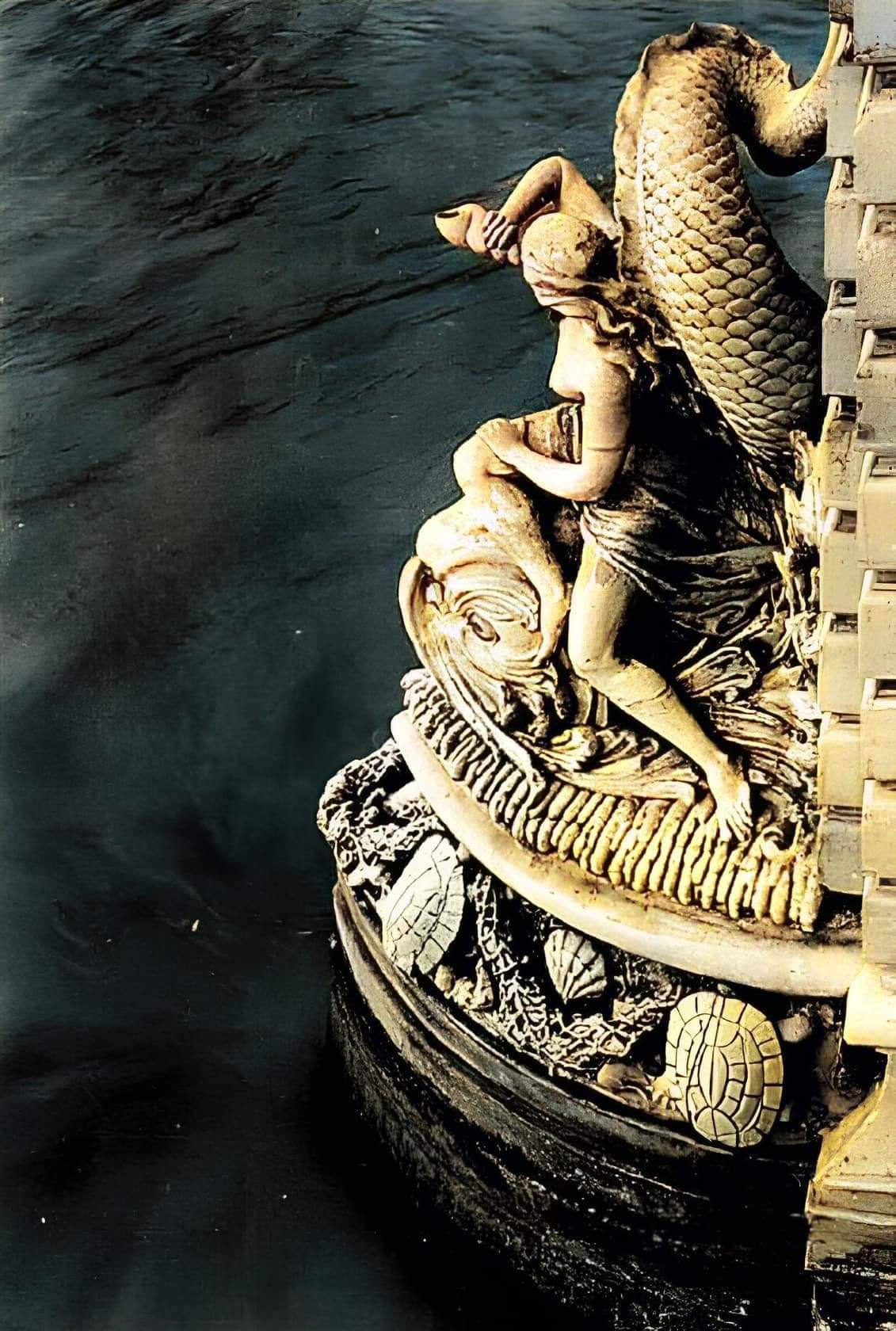
Pier sculpture

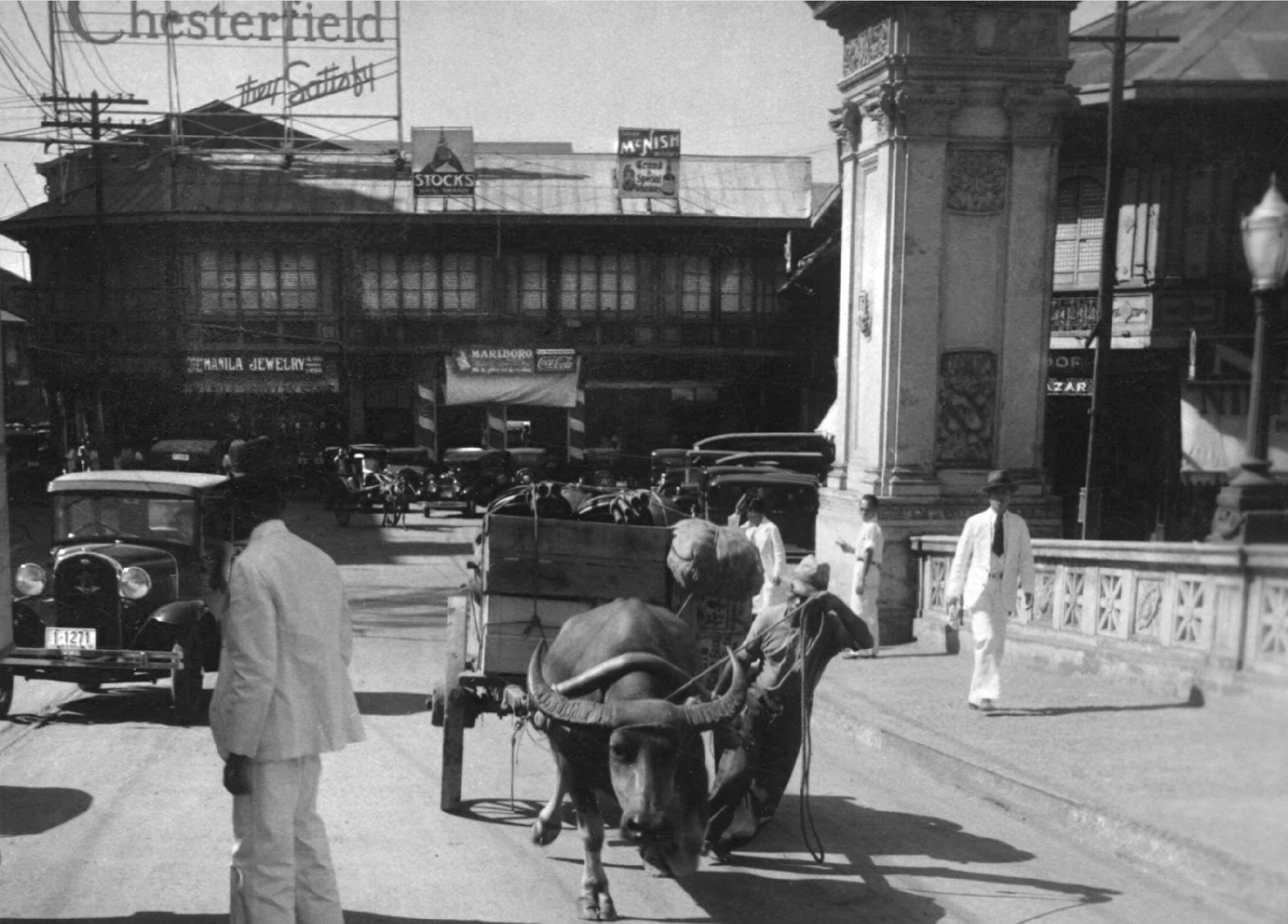
Plaza Moraga side of Jones Bridge

==== World War II ====
The bridge was renamed Banzai Bridge during the Japanese occupation through Executive Order No. 41 issued by Philippine Executive Commission Chairman Jorge B. Vargas in 1942. During the Second World War, the Japanese Army bombed the bridge against the incoming American troops during the Battle of Manila. One of the four statues was permanently lost during the destruction. After the war, a Bailey bridge was set up as a temporary vehicular passageway while the main bridge was being rebuilt.

Gallery of the Jones Bridge at the end of World War II
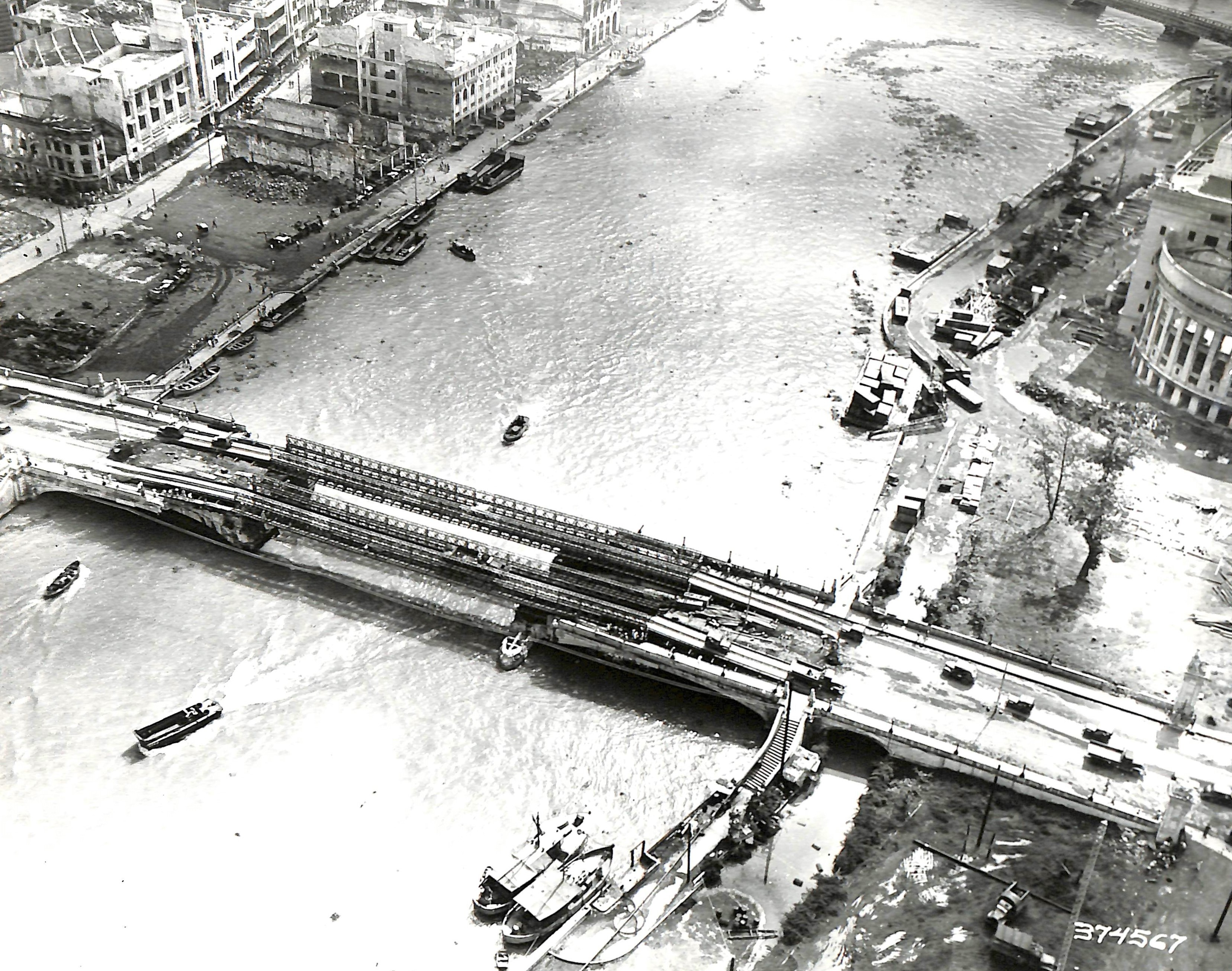
The Jones Bridge and its surrounding buildings destroyed following the Liberation of Manila

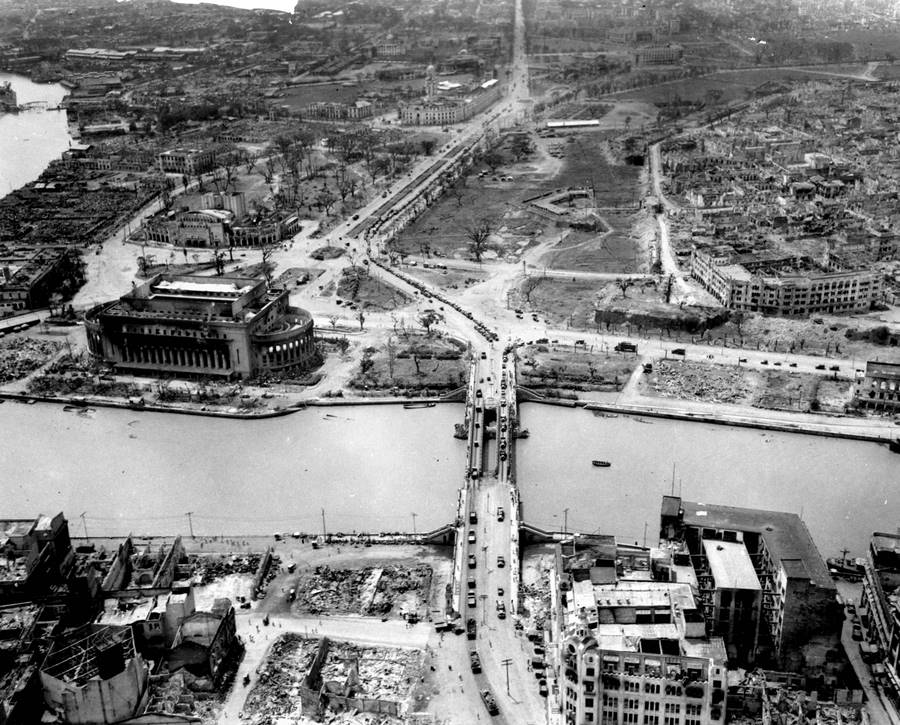
Aerial view of the temporary Bailey bridge and Ermita

=== Second Jones Bridge (1946–present) ===
==== Post-war reconstruction ====
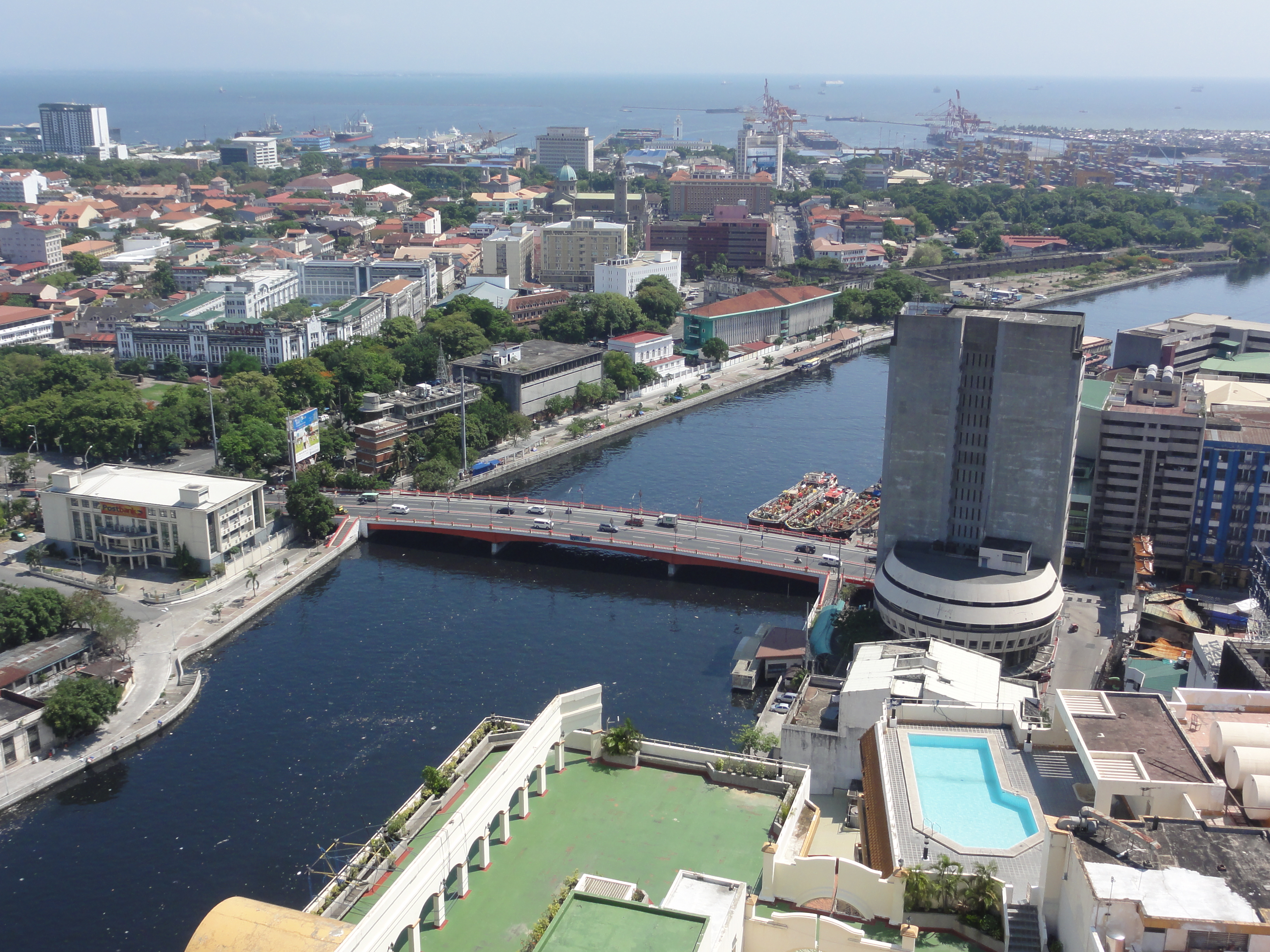
Aerial view of the Jones Bridge in 2015 (with Intramuros and Manila Bay in the background)

Following the passage of the Philippine Rehabilitation Act of 1945, the Philippine Bureau of Public Works and the U.S. Bureau of Public Roads reconstructed the Jones and Quezon bridges using large and deep steel girders. Upon its completion, none of its original ornamentation on either piers or balustrades was restored, and its neoclassical aesthetic was replaced with unadorned architecture in an urgent haste to finish its reconstruction. The three remaining La Madre Filipina statues were also removed, and its plinths were demolished. One was relocated within Rizal Park, while the other two were relocated to the entrance of the Court of Appeals Main Building.

==== 1998 restoration ====
In 1998, in celebration of the Philippine Centennial Independence, the bridge was partially restored by architect Conrad Onglao, who was commissioned by then-First Lady Amelita Ramos. Stone balustrades replaced the post-modern steel design. During the time of Manila Mayor Lito Atienza, the steel girders were lighted and thematic lamp posts were added onto the bridge, which drew mixed reactions. Two fu dogs were also added at the base of the bridge's south side, which gave it a Chinese character as opposed to its original neoclassical design.

==== 2019 redevelopment ====
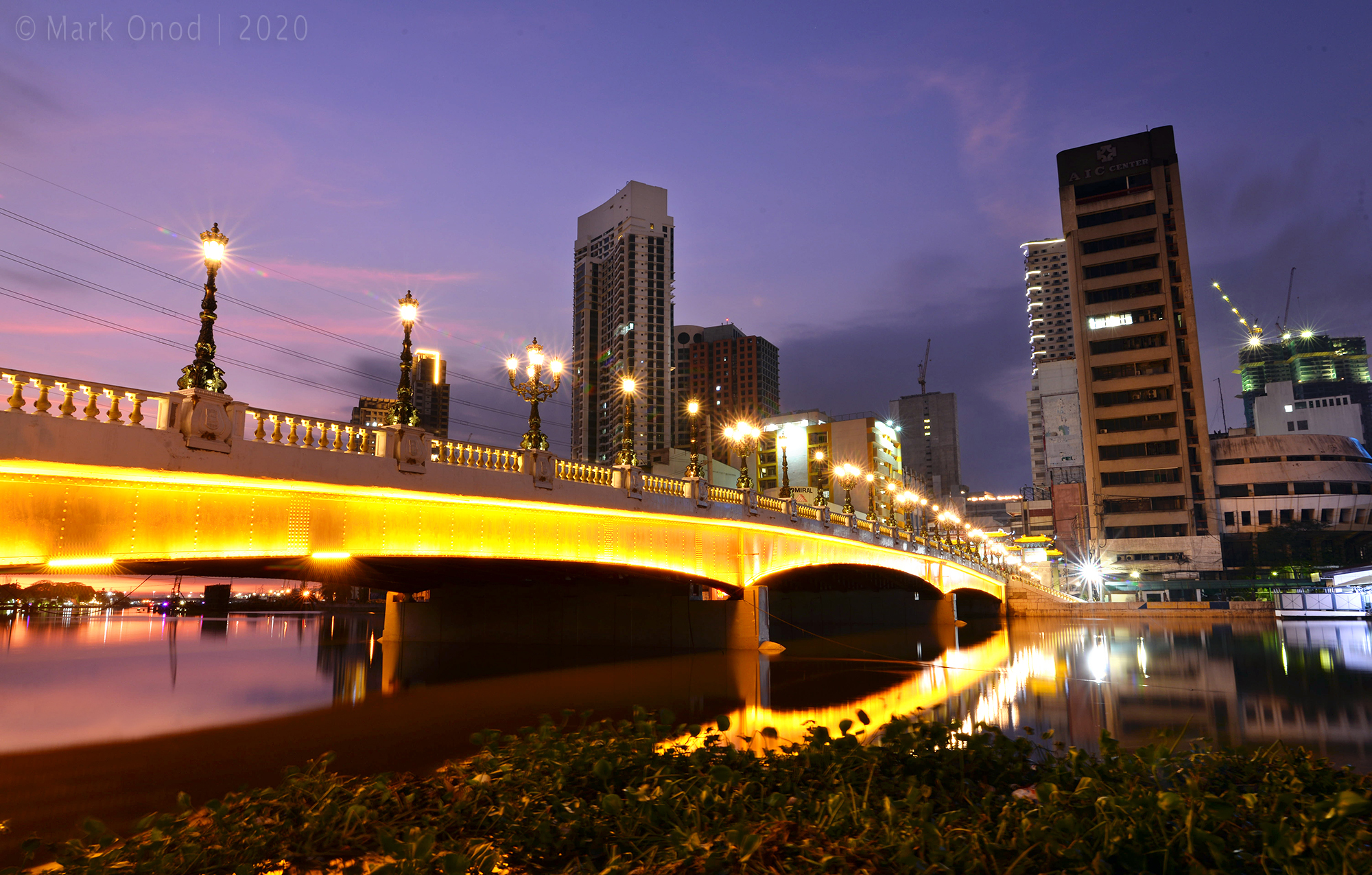
The steel girders of Jones Bridge are lighted at night.

In 2019, Manila Mayor Isko Moreno announced plans to "restore" the Jones Bridge to its near-original architecture, including the return of the three surviving sculptures that had previously guarded the bridge, using the ₱20 million donated towards the project. The fourth sculpture destroyed by the war was replicated using the archives of the pre-war Jones Bridge in the National Library of the Philippines. Moreno commissioned Jose Acuzar, owner of Las Casas Filipinas de Acuzar, to design and build Beaux-Arts-styled lamp posts similar to those on Pont Alexandre III. The four plinths for the La Madre Filipina statues were reconstructed, which would act as the pedestal for the returning sculptures. Retrofitting and repair works were also done on the steel girders of the bridge.

The statues of Gratitude and Democracy were reinstated at the bridge on November 22. Jones Bridge was inaugurated on November 24, 2019, and was formally opened to the public. However, the remaining statues of La Madre Filipina located at the grounds of the Court of Appeals were deemed too fragile to be moved for relocation to their original spots. They were instead replicated and reinstated at their original locations in June 2021.

==== 2019-present ====
As part of the construction of the Pasig River Esplanade, the bridge was rehabilitated and new lighting were installed in the girders of the bridge in 2025. It was the initiative of the Federation of Filipino-Chinese Chambers of Commerce and Industry (FFCCI) through a private-public partnership and in close coordination with the City Government of Manila. Every weekend, the bridge features thematic lighting in order to attract more tourist.

== Sculptures ==
The plinths at the Binondo entry of Jones Bridge where the statues of Progress and Justice are located.

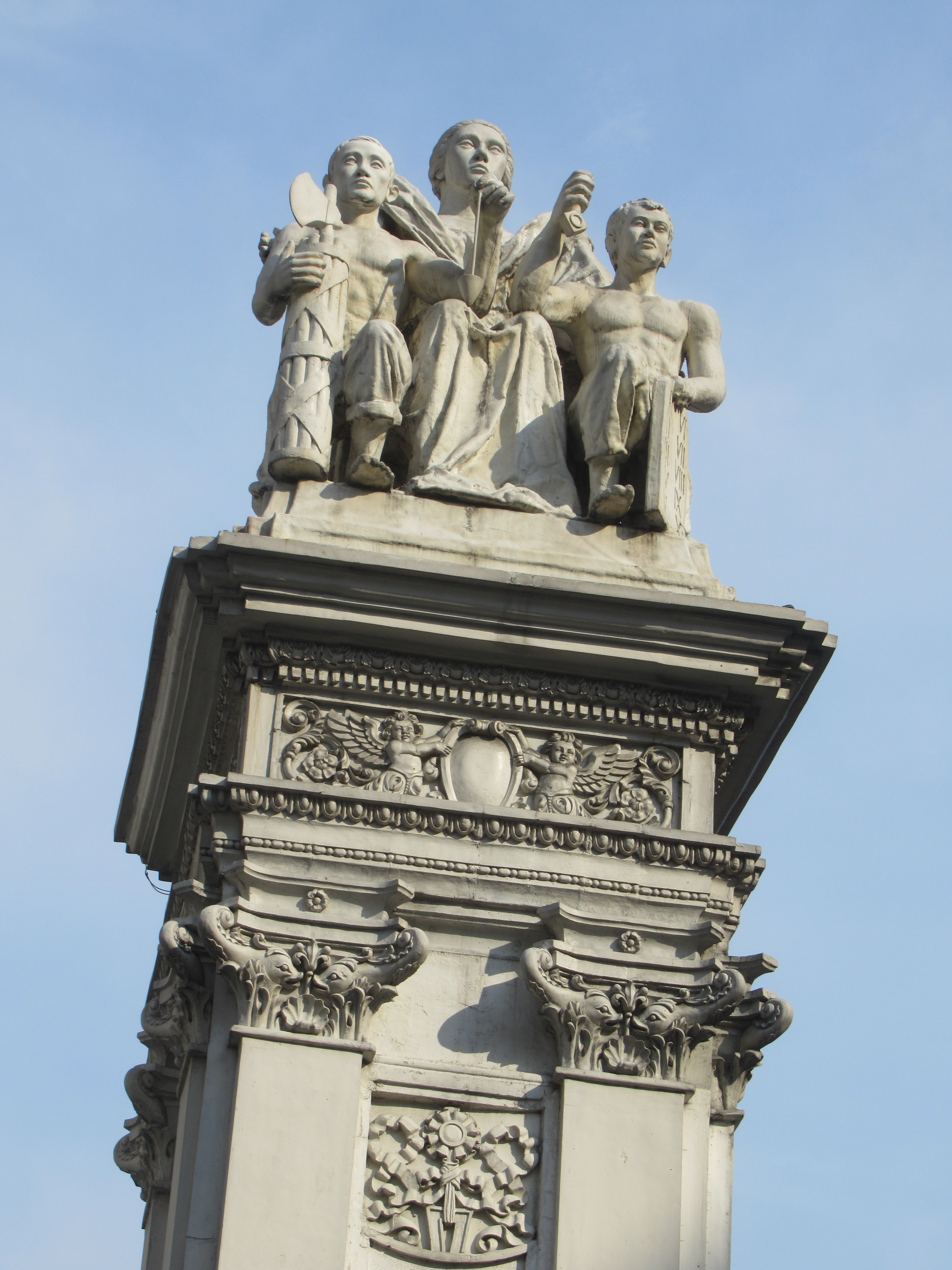
La Madre Filipina

The four statues guarding the bridge are called La Madre Filipina (The Philippine Motherland). Three were spared from the war but relocated. The fourth one was destroyed, and it was replicated in the 2019 redevelopment. Each statue symbolizes a different aspect of nationhood since the Philippines was transitioning from being a colony of the United States to gaining its independence at the time.

- Gratitude: Located on the southeast corner of the bridge, this sculpture was transferred to Rizal Park after World War II and reinstated in its original location after 74 years. While on display at the park, it was prominently called La Madre Filipina.
- Democracy: Destroyed during the Battle of Manila in 1945. It was replicated in 2019 using archives provided by the National Library of the Philippines and installed at the southwest corner of the bridge where the former statue once stood.
- Progress: Located on the northwest corner of the bridge, it symbolizes labor, education and power. A replica of the original statue was installed in June 2021, together with Justice. The original one, located on the grounds of the Court of Appeals, was deemed too fragile to be relocated.
- Justice: Located on the northeast corner of the bridge, it symbolizes law and order and equality under the law. A replica of the original statue was installed in June 2021, together with Progress. The original one, located on the grounds of the Court of Appeals, was deemed too fragile to be relocated.

== Traffic ==
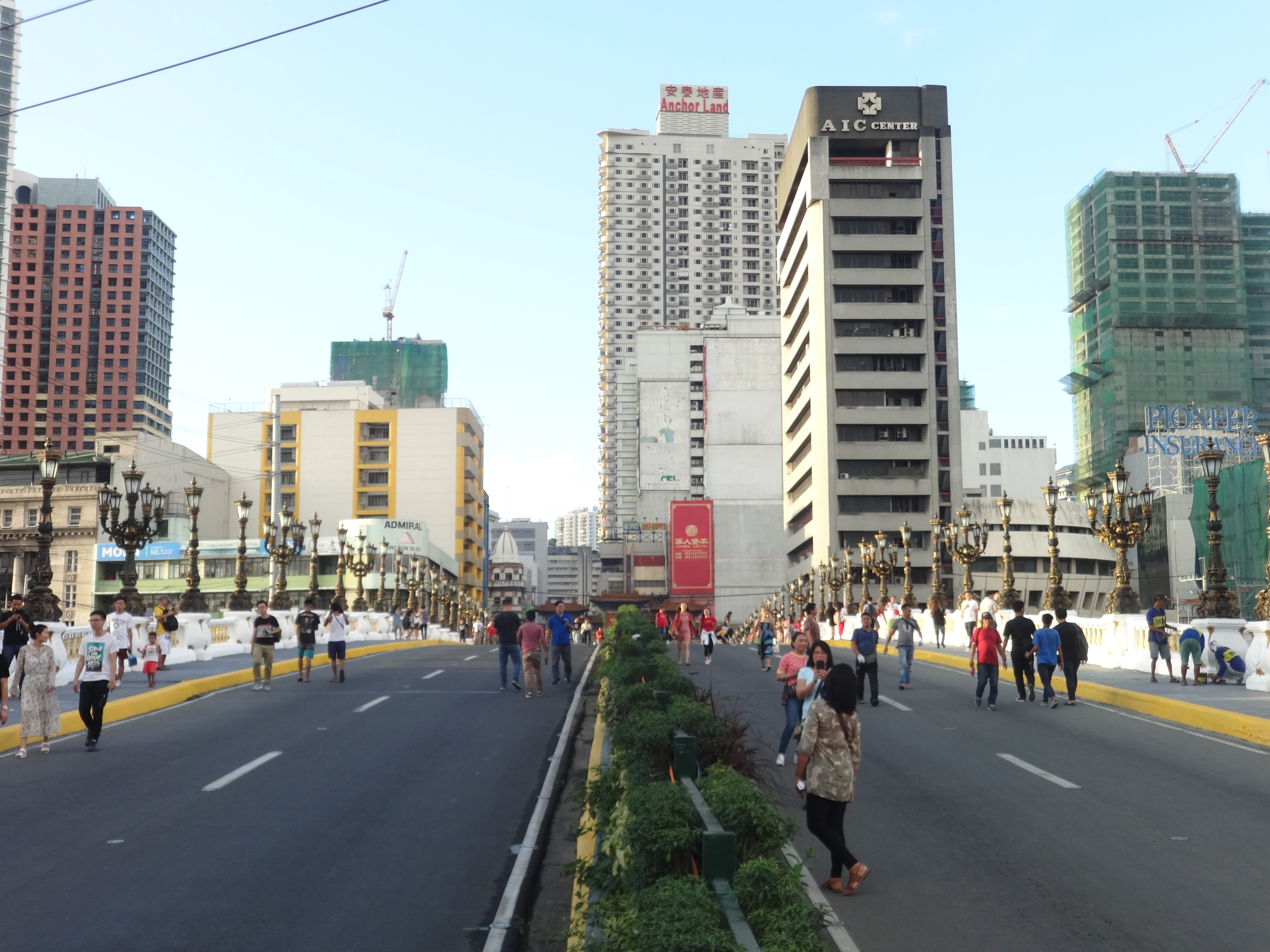
View from the bridge looking north to Binondo during its 2019 inauguration.

The Jones Bridge rarely suffers from traffic congestion, which usually occurs at both ends of the bridge due to parking violations. Water buses of Pasig River Ferry Service also habitually pass under it to reach its Escolta Street station. Every January 9 of the year since 2013, the Metropolitan Manila Development Authority annually closes the bridge from car passage for a procession during the Feast of the Black Nazarene after the Department of Public Works and Highways deemed the nearby MacArthur Bridge unstable to accommodate increasing foot traffic during the festivities. However, the Translacion was rerouted to Ayala Bridge starting in 2020, which was recently retrofitted.

== Incidents ==
In 1989, the bridge was the location of an ambush in which P2 million in cash was stolen, and two policemen were killed.

In 2012, the Philippine Coast Guard issued a ban on swimming along the Pasig River after three floating bodies were discovered within the vicinity of the bridge.

In 2019, the Pasig River Rehabilitation Commission rescued three teenagers who were struggling to swim under the bridge from drowning.

== In popular culture ==
- The bridge was featured in the 2021 Philippine romantic fantasy The Lost Recipe.
- The 2007 Filipino film The Promise has a scene in which Daniel (Richard Gutierrez) is tasked with assassinating someone underneath the bridge's tunnel. Although he was unable to do it, he sets the man free afterwards.
- The bridge is the backdrop for the 1989 film Jones Bridge Massacre: Task Force Clabio, starring Lito Lapid. The film was based on real-life events.
- The bridge was also featured in the 2023 Philippine action series FPJ's Batang Quiapo as one of its locations.

== Gallery ==
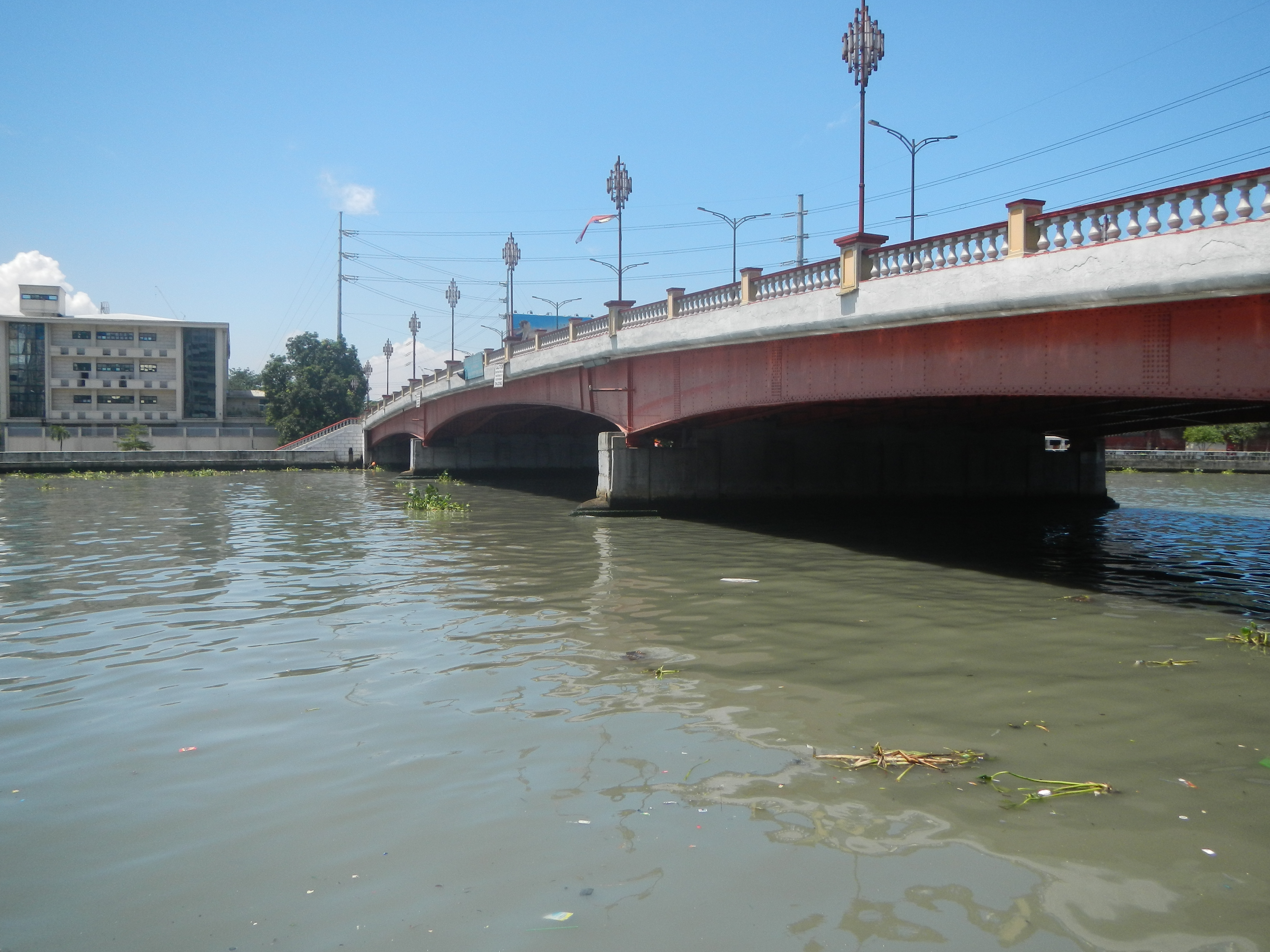
Jones Bridge in 2016

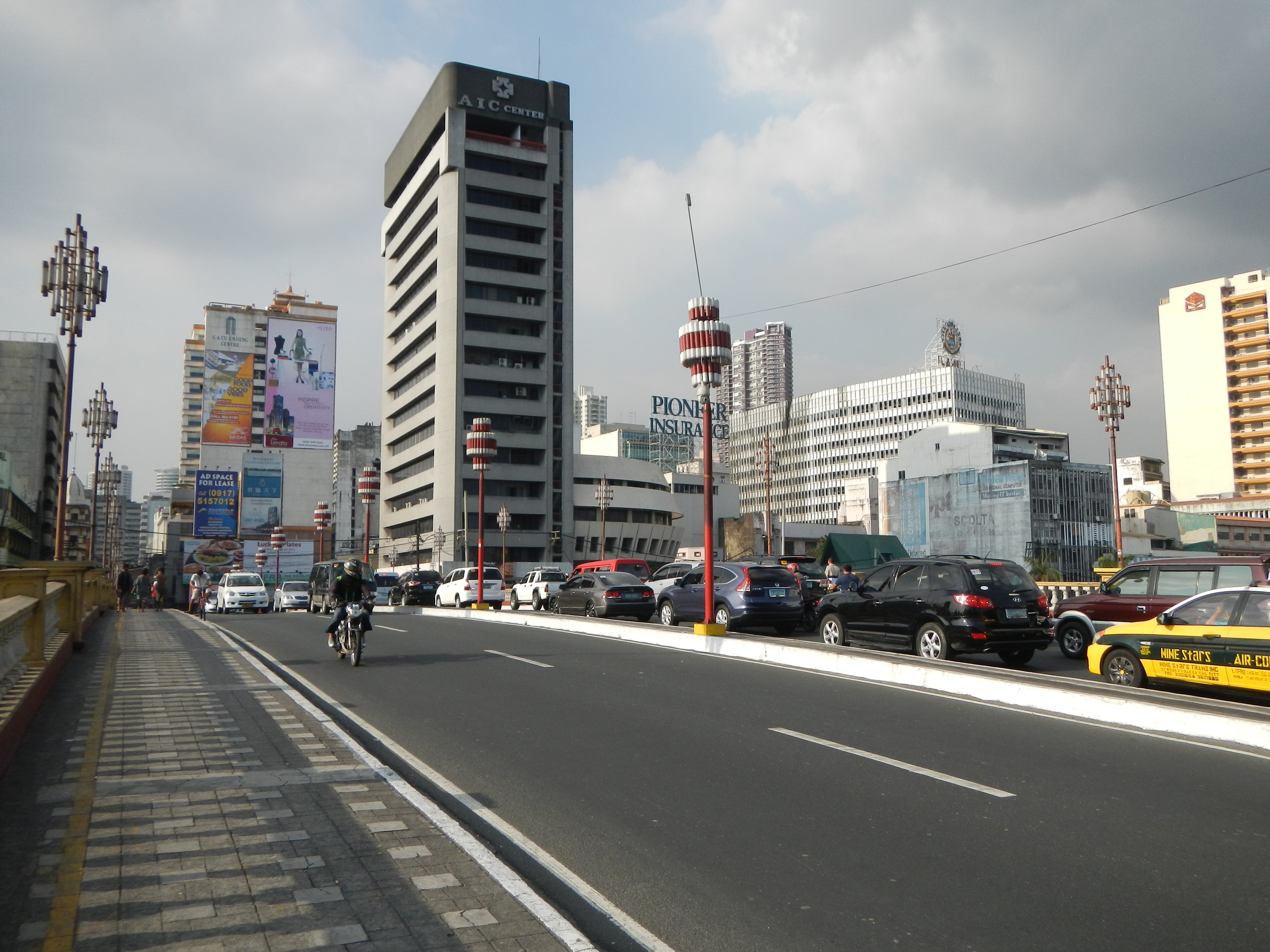
Carriageway of the bridge prior to the 2019 redevelopment

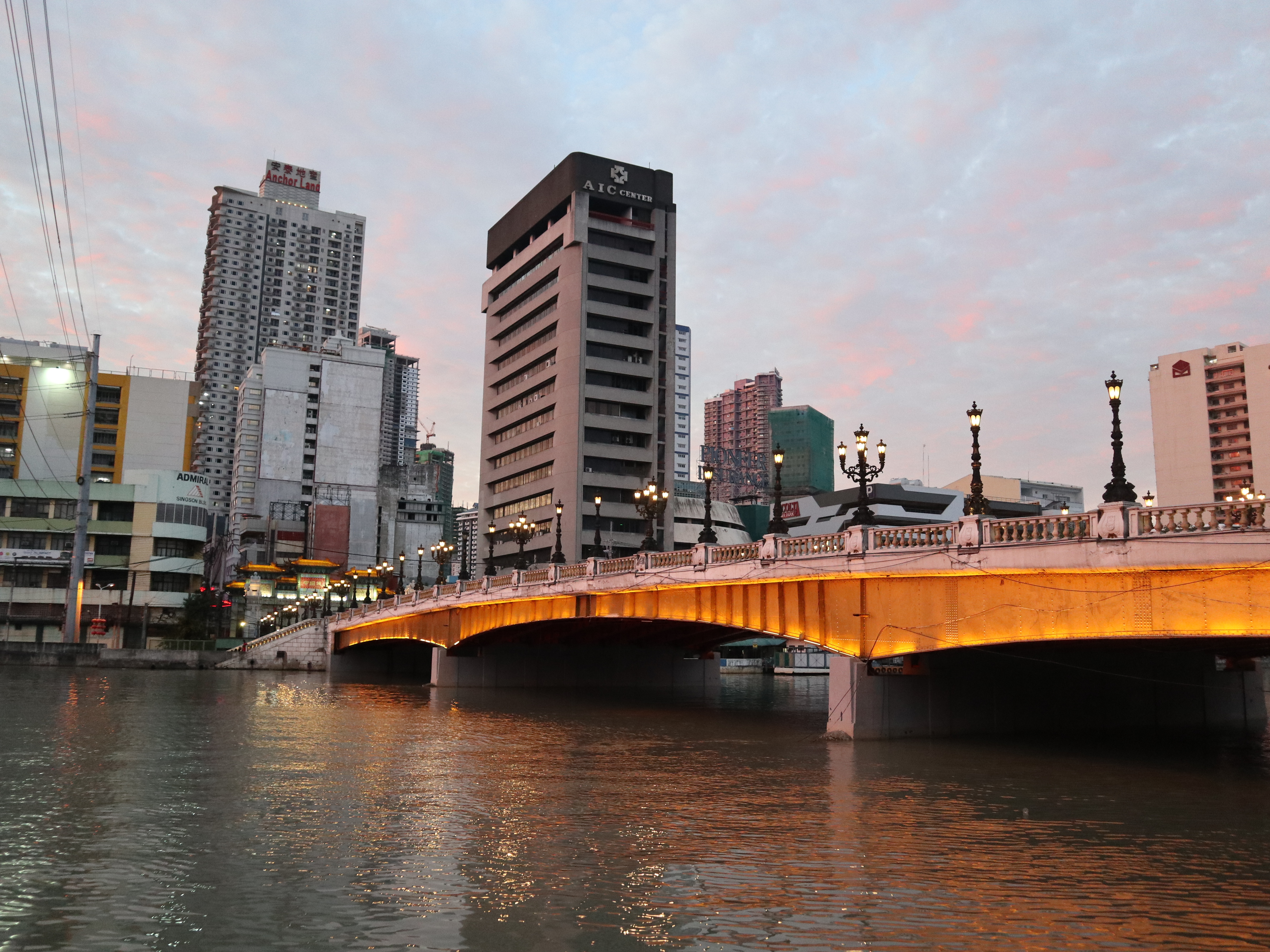
Jones Bridge at sunset

== See also ==
- Spanish East Indies
- Spanish Filipino
- Philippine Spanish
- Chavacano
- Captaincy General of the Philippines
- Intramuros Grand Marian Procession
- Gates of Intramuros
- Fort Santiago
- List of crossings of the Pasig River
- List of Philippine historic sites
- Malagonlong Bridge
- Bridge of Isabel II
