= Puente de España =

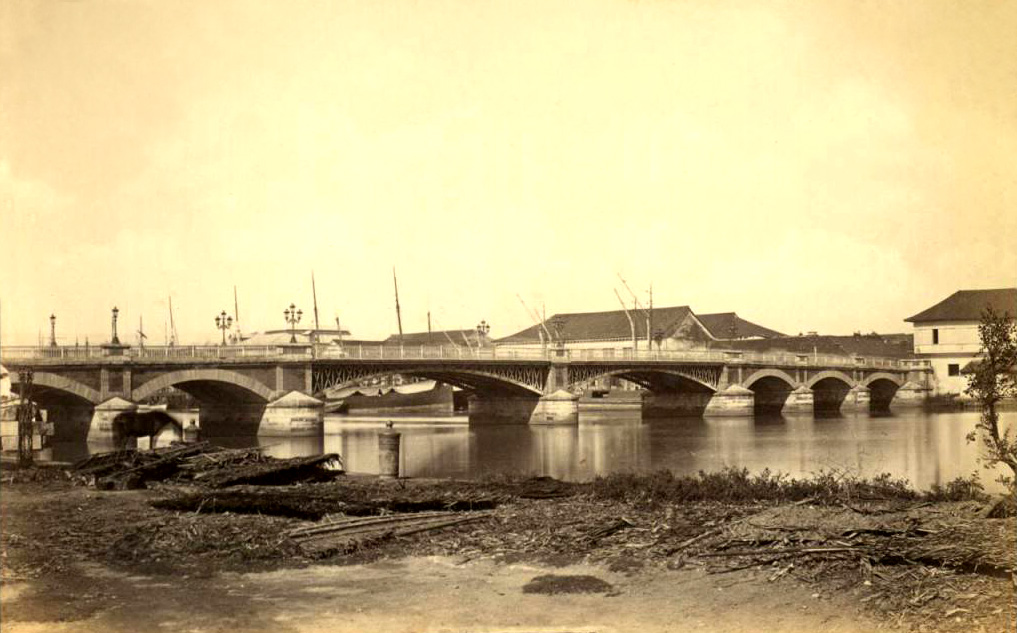
- The Puente de España in 1899
- Coordinates: 14°35′46″N 120°58′40.4″E
- Carried: Vehicular and pedestrian traffic (1630–1914); Streetcar (1905–1914)
- Crossed: Pasig River
- Locale: Manila, Philippines
- Other name: Puente Grande or Puente de Piedra (1630–1863)
- Preceded by: Puente Colgante (1852), now Quezon Bridge; Santa Cruz Bridge (1902)
- Followed by: None

Characteristics
- Material: Volcanic tuff
- Total length: 414.25 ft (126.26 m)
- Width: 22.25 ft (6.78 m) (1814–1901) widened in 1901
- No. of spans: Puente Grande, 10; Puente de España, 8

History
- Architect: Lucas de Jesus María (1630)
- Engineering design by: Antonio Herrera (1630)
- Constructed by: Spanish colonial government in the Philippines
- Construction start: 1626
- Construction end: 1630
- Opened: 1630
- Collapsed: 1914
- Closed: 1921

Location
- Interactive map of Puente de España

The Puente de España (lit. 'Bridge of Spain') was a bridge that spanned the Pasig River in the Philippines, connecting the areas of Intramuros and Binondo, on Calle Nueva (now E.T. Yuchengco St) with central Manila. The span was the oldest established in the country before it was damaged by a flood in 1914. The bridge was replaced by the Jones Bridge, constructed from 1919 to 1921, located one block downriver from Puente de España on Calle Rosario (now Quintin Paredes St).

== Puente Grande ==
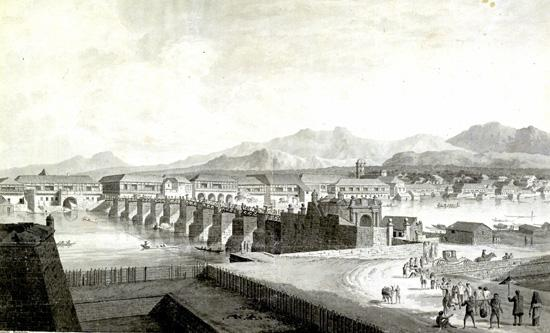
The Puente Grande with wooden superstructure spanning the Pasig River as sketched in 1794 by Fernando Brambila, a member of the Malaspina Expedition.

The first bridge to cross the Pasig River was the Puente Grande, a ten-span bridge opened in 1630 by the Spanish colonial government. Work on the bridge started in 1626 during the term of Spanish Governor-General Fernándo de Silva, who reported that the city had decided to build a stone bridge over the river. The beam bridge connected Intramuros and the Binondo business district, making travel across the river easier and faster than the ferry service that existed before. The bridge was completed in 1630 under Juan Niño de Tabora. The bridge was built without cost to the treasury, as the Sangleys (Chinese) had paid for it because it relieved them of ferryboat charges.

=== Bridge design ===
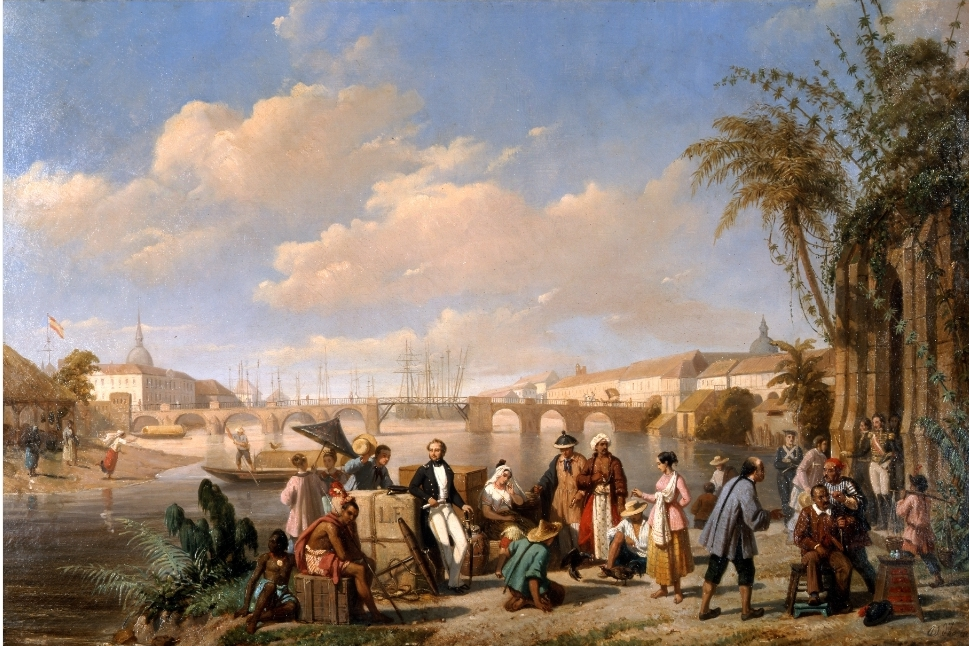
View of Puente Grande circa 1800's.

Construction work was directed by the Recollect priest Lucas de Jesus María. The bridge, as built, consisted of stone piers and a wooden superstructure. At the south end of the bridge was a structure called Fortín y Mira (small fort and look-out). Its use was to guard this approach to the city as part of the defense of Manila. The wooden superstructure, besides being more easily and cheaply built, had a military value in that communications between the two parts of the city, as divided by the river, could be easily and quickly destroyed by destroying the woodwork. This was done during an insurrection of the Chinese in 1638.

=== Construction of the bridge ===
The engineering work of the bridge is credited to Antonio Herrera, an Augustinian friar. To expose the river bed, Herrera diverted half of the water of the river into the moats and esteros (canals) that existed along the east and south fronts of the walled city and then cut a channel from the west end of the moat on the south (near Paseo de Luneta) to the sea. By building heavy dikes, he removed the water from a part of the river bed, which permitted the construction of the piers for half of the bridge. The same plan was followed for the piers of the other half. The piers were built of a local stone, known locally as Guadalupe adobe stone, named from where the stones were quarried (now Brgy. Guadalupe Viejo in Makati), its formation being a volcanic tuff.

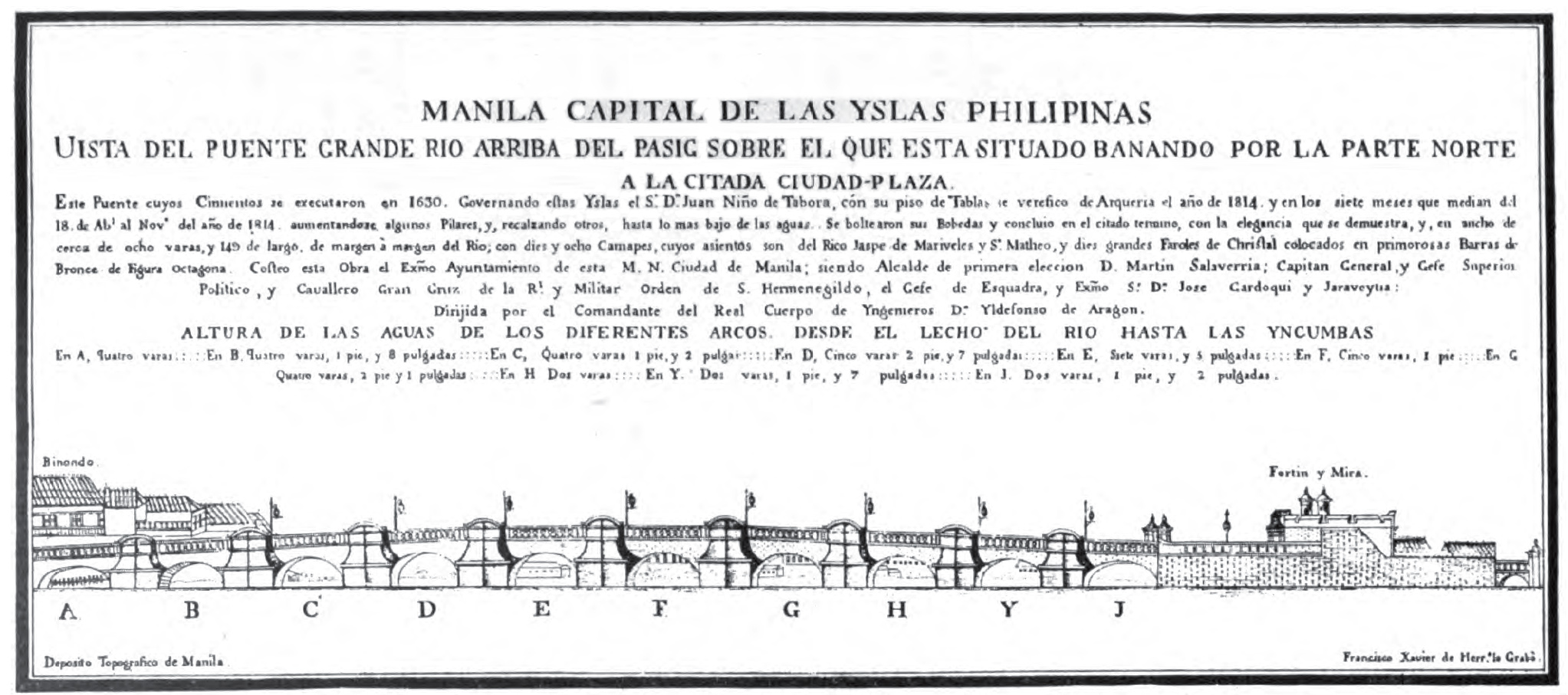
The Puente Grande, also called the Puente de Piedra (stone bridge) after the wooden superstructure, was replaced with stone arches in 1814.

== Puente de Piedra ==
In 1814, the wooden superstructures were replaced with stone arches and the stone piers were strengthened. The bridge was also called Puente de Piedra (Stone Bridge), while the old name remained popular. The earthquake of 3 June 1863, one of the strongest to hit the Philippines, levelled most of Manila. The bridge was damaged when its central piers sank.

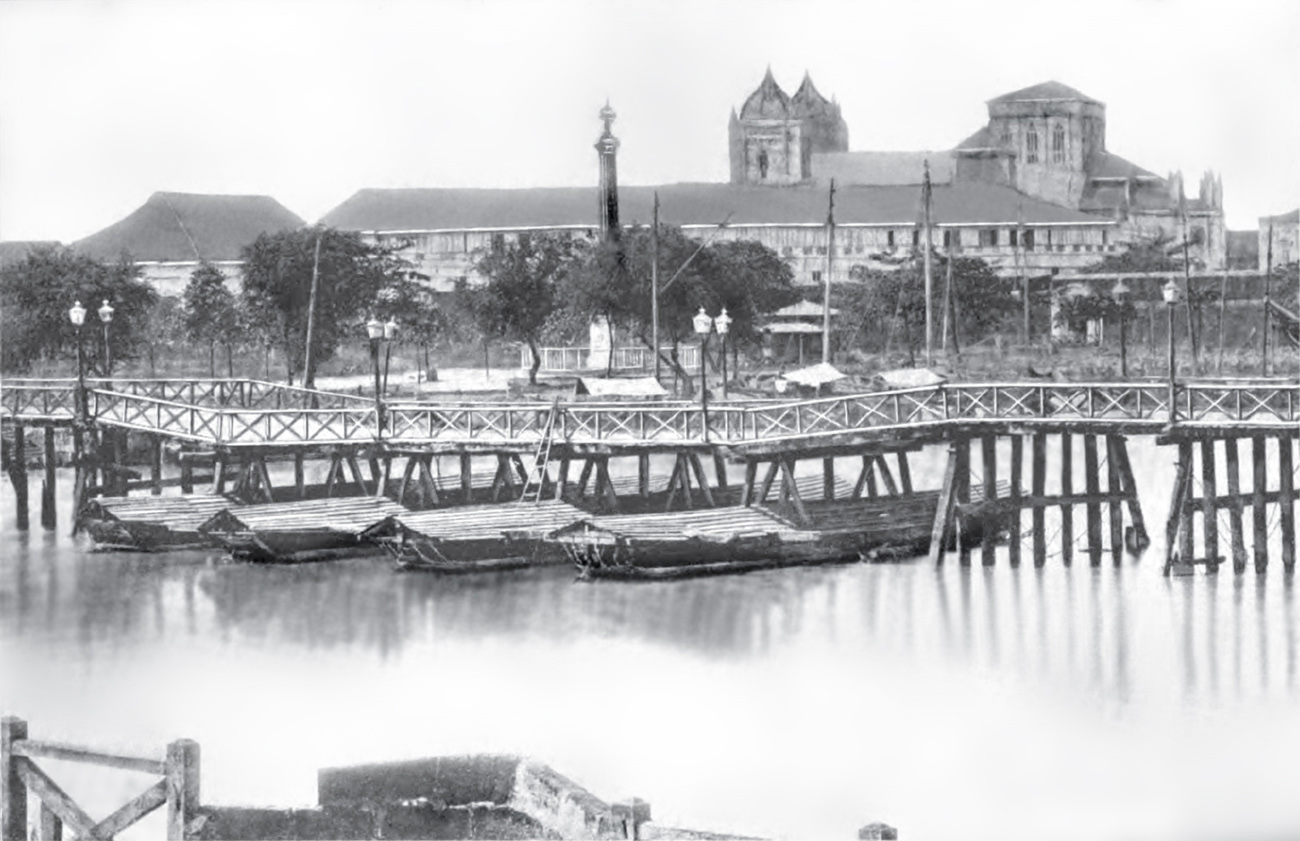
The temporary pontoon bridge that spanned adjacent to Puente Grande after it was damaged by the 1863 earthquake. In the background are the newly reconstructed Santo Domingo Church and the Magellan Monument.

== Puente de Barcas ==
While the Puente Grande was being assessed and repaired, a temporary pontoon bridge called Puente de Barcas (Bridge of Boats) was constructed one block below at Calle Rosario. In the middle of the bridge, the spans were supported by cascos, or large flat-bottomed boats common in the area.

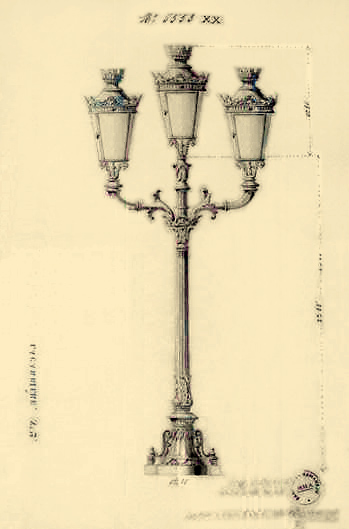
The triple-branched street lamp made by La Carrière in Paris and commissioned by José Echeverría to adorn and illuminate the Puente de España

During the reconstruction of the old bridge, the two piers near the centre were removed, lessening the number of spans to eight. Then, two steel-ribbed central spans were used to span the space left by the removed piers. The bridge was opened on 1 January 1875 and renamed Puente de España.

== American colonial period ==
The bridge remained unchanged until 1901, during the American colonial era, when it was widened to accommodate more pedestrians and vehicles, even with the construction of the nearby Santa Cruz Bridge, which started in 1900. With the addition of additional lanes of traffic, the street lamps on the bridge were removed. In 1905, tracks were laid on the bridge to accommodate the "tranvías", a tram (streetcar) system in Manila.

=== Destruction ===
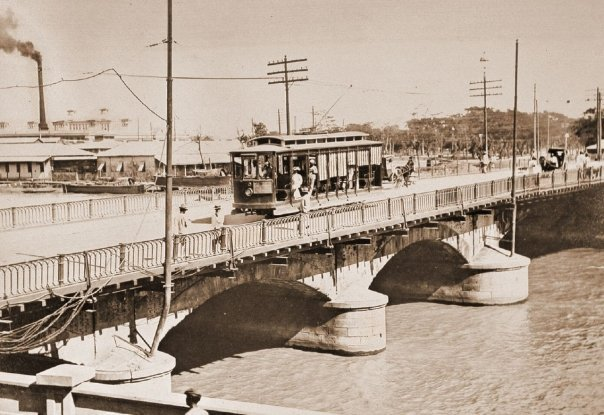
The Puente de España during the American colonial period, after it was widened and tracks were added for streetcars

In September 1914, nonstop rains flooded the streets of Manila and swelled the Pasig River. The flood damaged the central pier of the bridge, which was removed. After a few months, a temporary truss bridge was installed over the remaining spans, while a replacement bridge was constructed one block downstream.

=== Jones Bridge ===
In 1916, construction was started on a neoclassical reinforced concrete arch bridge by the American colonial government across Calle Rosario on the site of the old temporary Puente de Barcas. The span was renamed Jones Bridge after former Virginia Rep. William Atkinson Jones, the principal author of the Philippine Autonomy Act of 1916, a bill assuring the future independence of the Philippines. The bridge was completed and opened for traffic in 1921. Soon after, the Puente de España was dismantled, ending its long history. Its replacement, Jones Bridge, was destroyed by bombs during the Battle of Manila in World War II and was subsequently rebuilt in 1946.

== See also ==
- Spanish East Indies
- Captaincy General of the Philippines
- Intramuros Grand Marian Procession
- Gates of Intramuros
- Fort Santiago
- Malagonlong Bridge
- Bridge of Isabel II
