= Bridge of Isabel II =

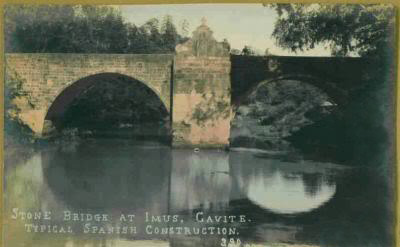
- The Bridge of Isabel II during the early 20th century.
- Coordinates: 14°25′48.7″N 120°56′25″E
- Crosses: Imus River
- Locale: Imus, Cavite
- Other name: Bridge of Ysabel II
- Named for: Isabella II of Spain
- Preceded by: Tomas Mascardo Bridge (aka Imus Toll Bridge)
- Followed by: Binakayan-Banalo Bridge

Characteristics
- Design: Arch bridge
- Material: Stone
- Total length: 158 ft (48 m)
- Width: 24.5 ft (7.5 m)
- No. of spans: Two
- Piers in water: One

History
- Architect: Matias Carbonell, O.A.R.
- Constructed by: The Augustinian Recollects and the townspeople of Imus
- Construction start: 1856
- Construction end: 1857
- Opened: 1857

Location
- Interactive map of Bridge of Isabel II

The Bridge of Isabel II is a historic bridge in the City of Imus in Cavite province, Philippines. The two-span stone arch bridge that was completed in 1857 was the site of the Battle of Imus, also known as the Battle of Imus River, on September 3, 1896, between the Filipino revolutionaries and the soldiers of the Spanish colonial government.

== Location ==
The Bridge of Isabel II in Imus was the first permanent bridge constructed over the Imus River, one of the longest rivers in the province, near the border with then municipality of Bacoor. The two-lane bridge connects Salinas Street in Barangay Palico, the last barangay of Imus before Bacoor, to the poblacion (town center) of Imus.

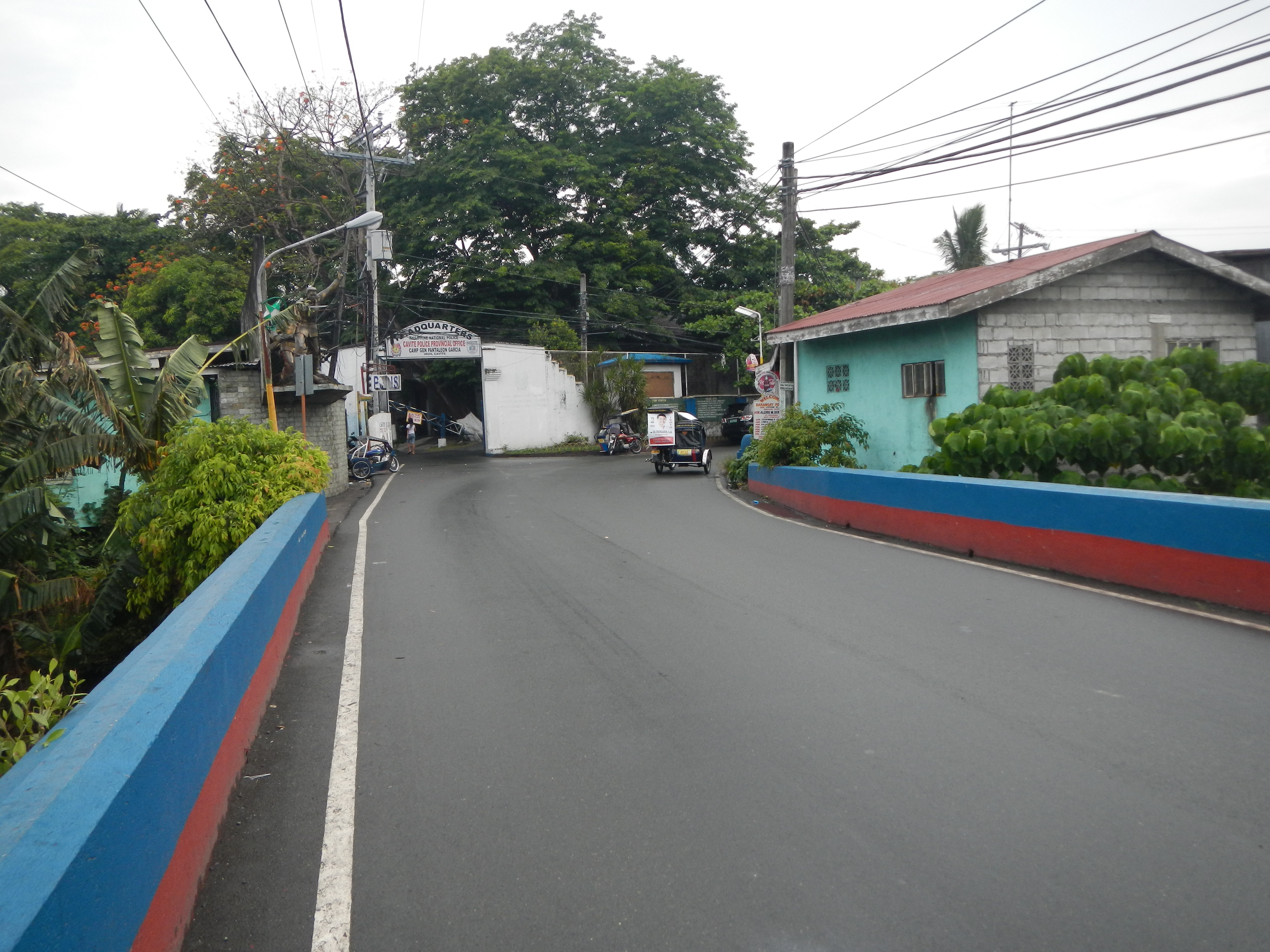
The southern end of the Bridge of Isabel II and the entrance to the former Imus Estate House now Camp Garcia.

The southern end of the bridge lands on General E. Topacio St. at the entrance to the former location of the Estate House of the Recollects, which then owned the Imus Estate (Hacienda de Imus), which covers the towns of Imus and Dasmariñas, and parts of Bacoor and Kawit. The estate house was the last stronghold of the Spaniards during the Battle of Imus in September 1896. The location is now the site of Cuartel or Camp Pantaleon Garcia, the Cavite headquarters of the Philippine National Police. Only the tall stone walls that surrounds the estate house is what remains of the former property.

== Features ==
The two-lane Bridge of Isabel II was built with stone masonry. The bridge measures about 158 ft (48 m) landing-to-landing with a width of about 24.5 ft (7.5 m).

In the middle of the bridge are sitting areas (where the historical markers are now placed) built during the construction of the bridge. The outline of the sitting areas when viewed from the top, follows the shape of the central pier of the bridge where the eastward pointed end points toward the source of the river thus deflecting the flow of the incoming water to prevent erosion. The center pier is about 40.5 ft (12.3 m) long from the western tip to the point end. The width of the central pier and the sitting areas is about 16 ft (4.9 m).

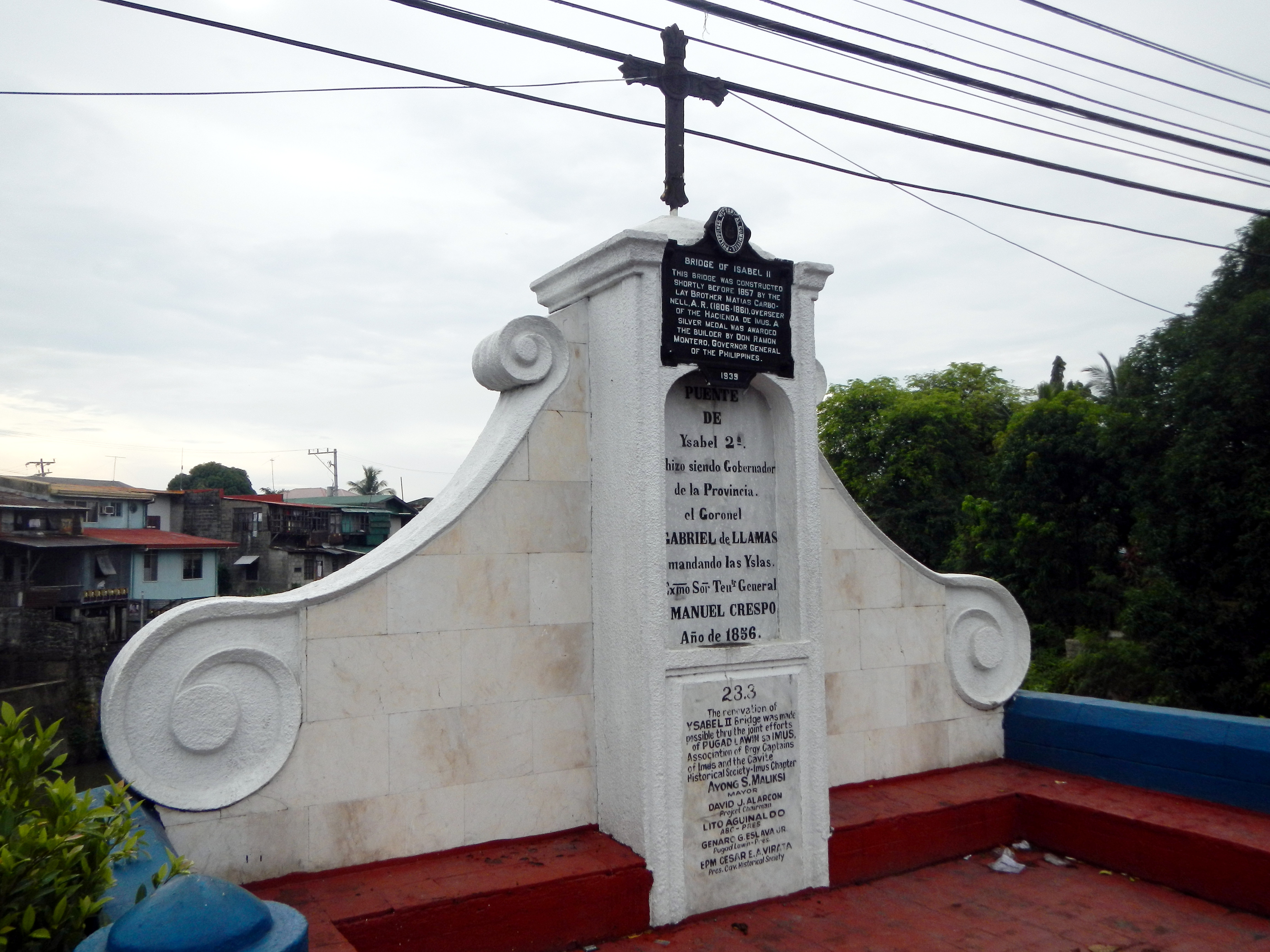
The western sitting area mimicking the top facade of the Imus Cathedral

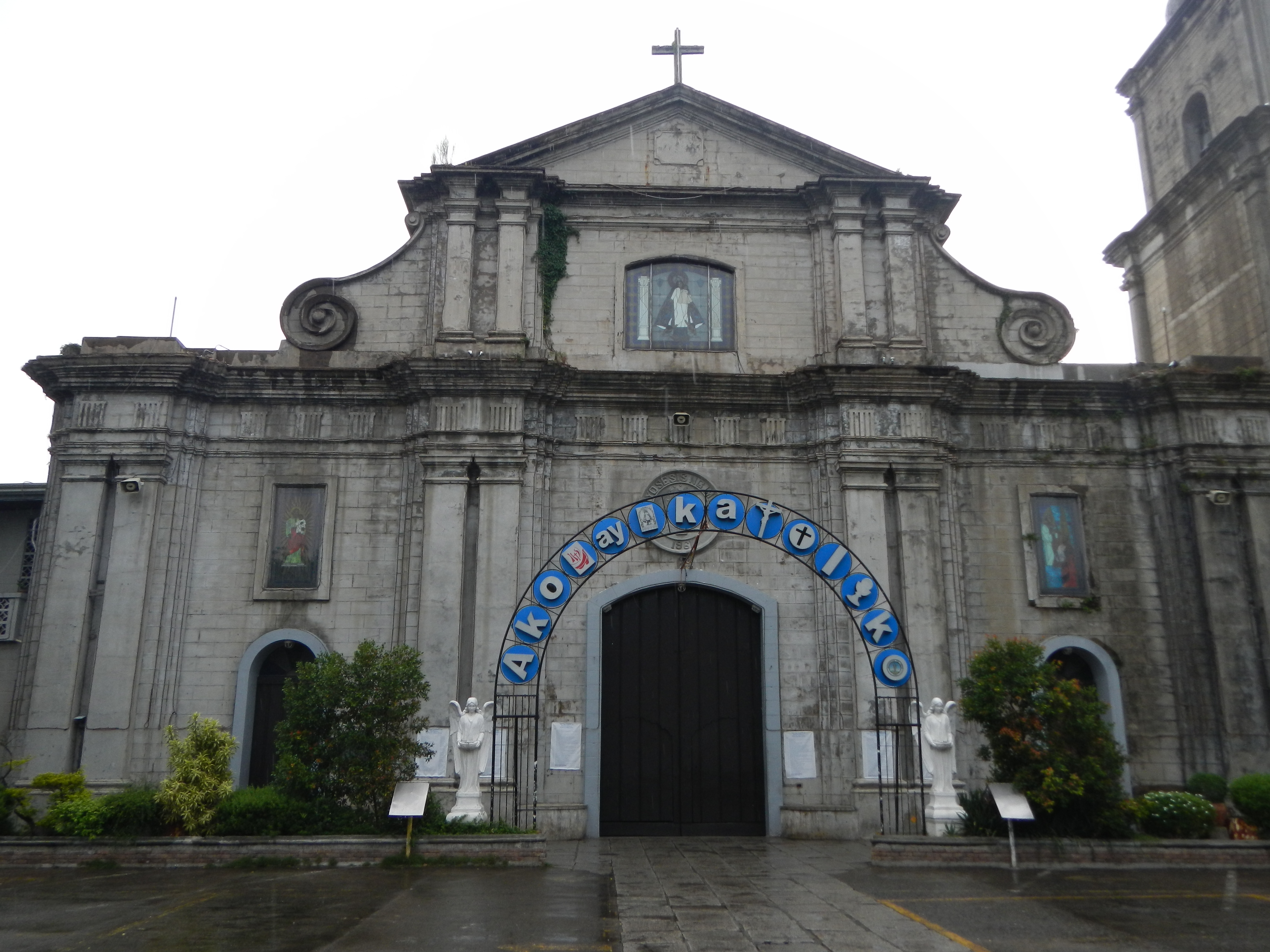
The Imus Cathedral with its scroll-like design in the upper facade.

In the western sitting area, the wall where the historical markers are situated, follows the design of the top facade of the Imus Cathedral with its curving scroll-like design, topped by a cross.

At the eastern pointed sitting area is a memorial marker to Jose Tagle, one of the local leaders during the Battle of Imus and former mayor (municipal captain) of Imus. At the southern end of the bridge adjoining the entrance to the Cuartel is a monument to commemorate the Battle of Imus.

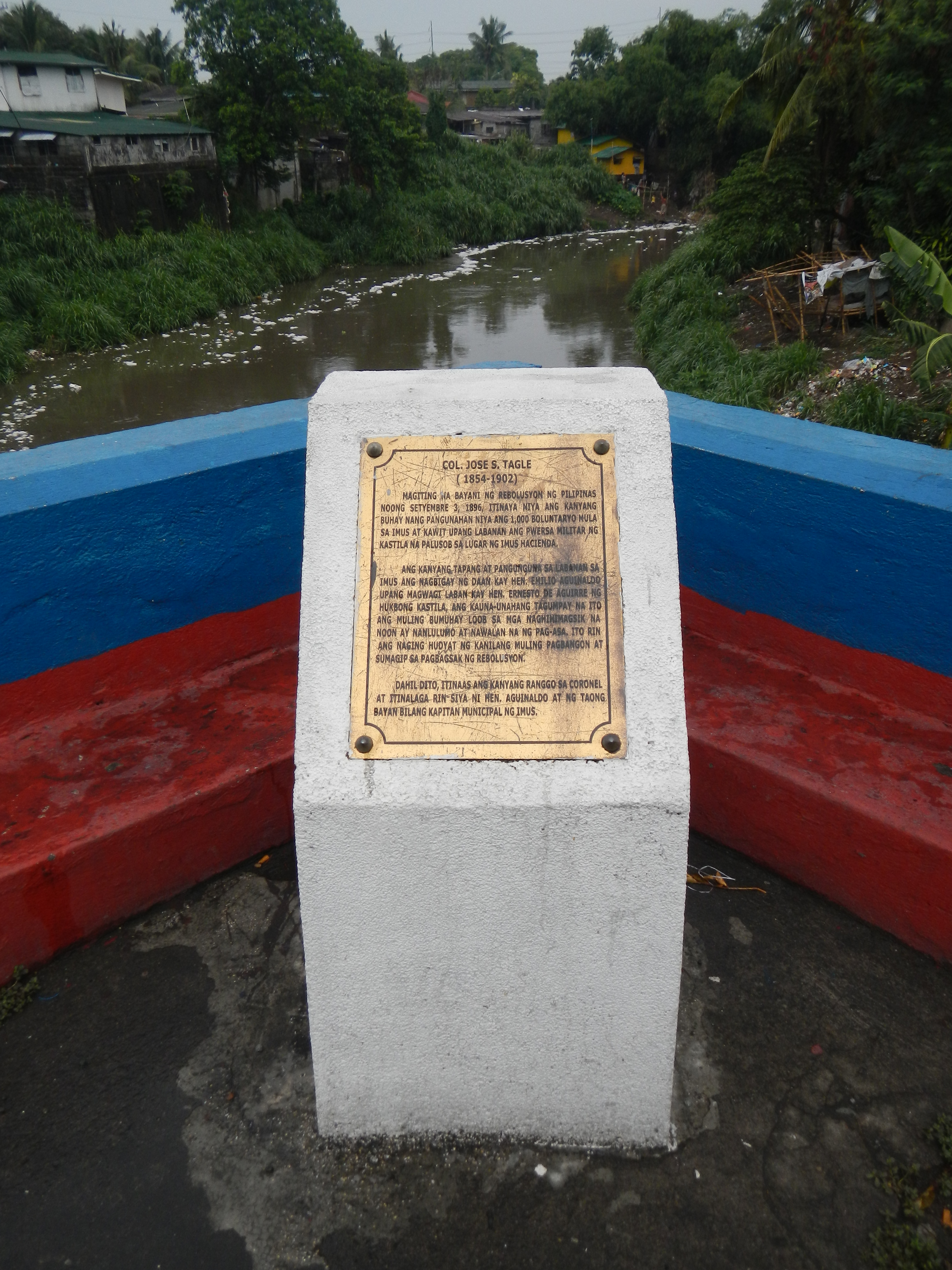
The memorial to Jose Tagle at the eastern pointed center area.

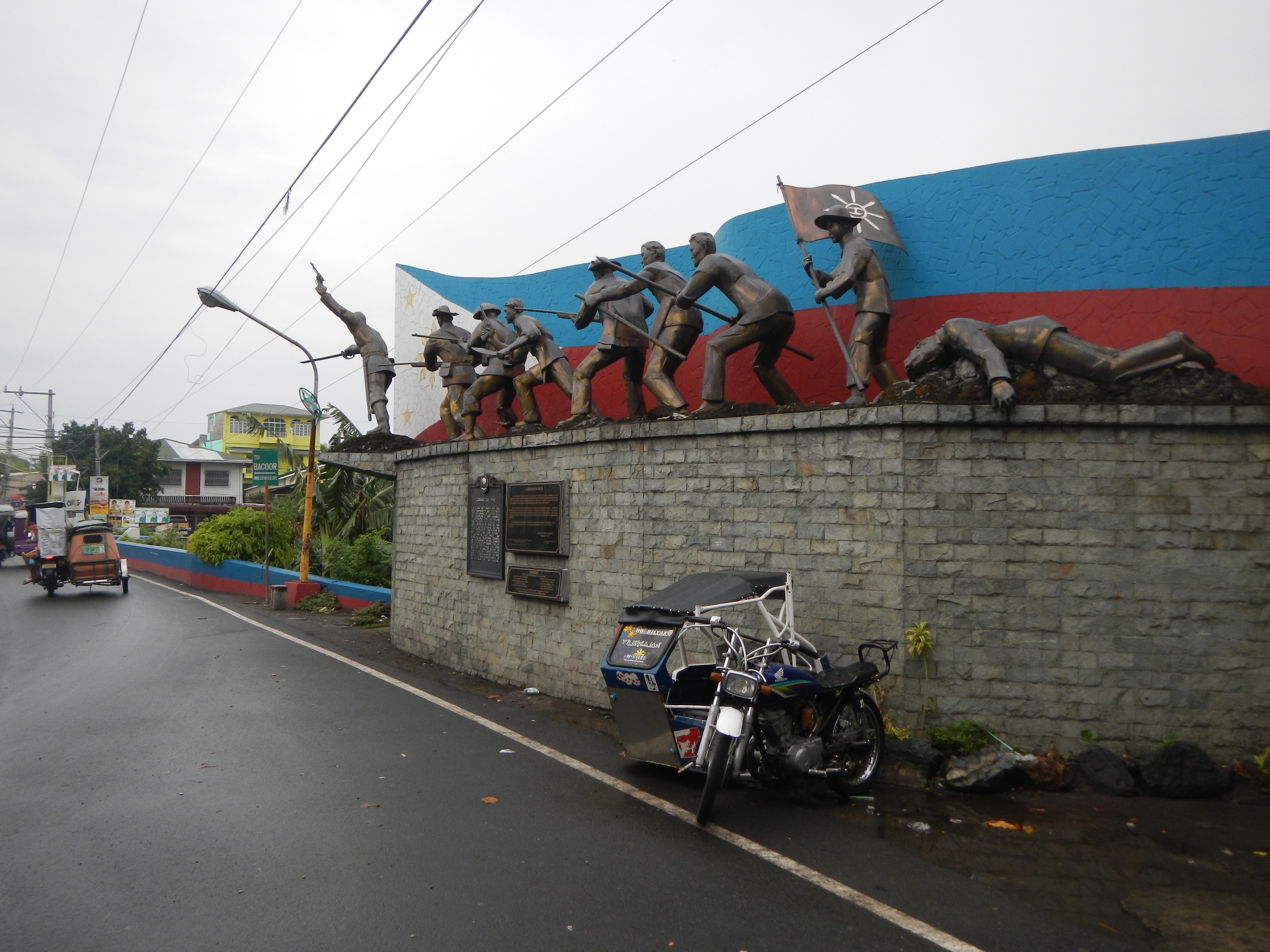
The Battle of Imus monument at the southern end of the bridge.

== History ==
The Bridge of Isabel II was constructed by the Augustinian Recollect fathers of Imus, headed by lay brother Matias Carbonell, also the overseer of the Hacienda de Imus (Imus Estate) of the Recollects. The road bridge was the first road that connects Imus to Manila through Bacoor. Construction of the bridge was started in 1856 during the governorship in Cavite of Col. Gabriel de Llamas and Governor-General Manuel Crespo.

The bridge was completed the following year in 1857. It was named after Queen Isabella II of Spain who was then the reigning monarch of Spain during the bridge's completion.

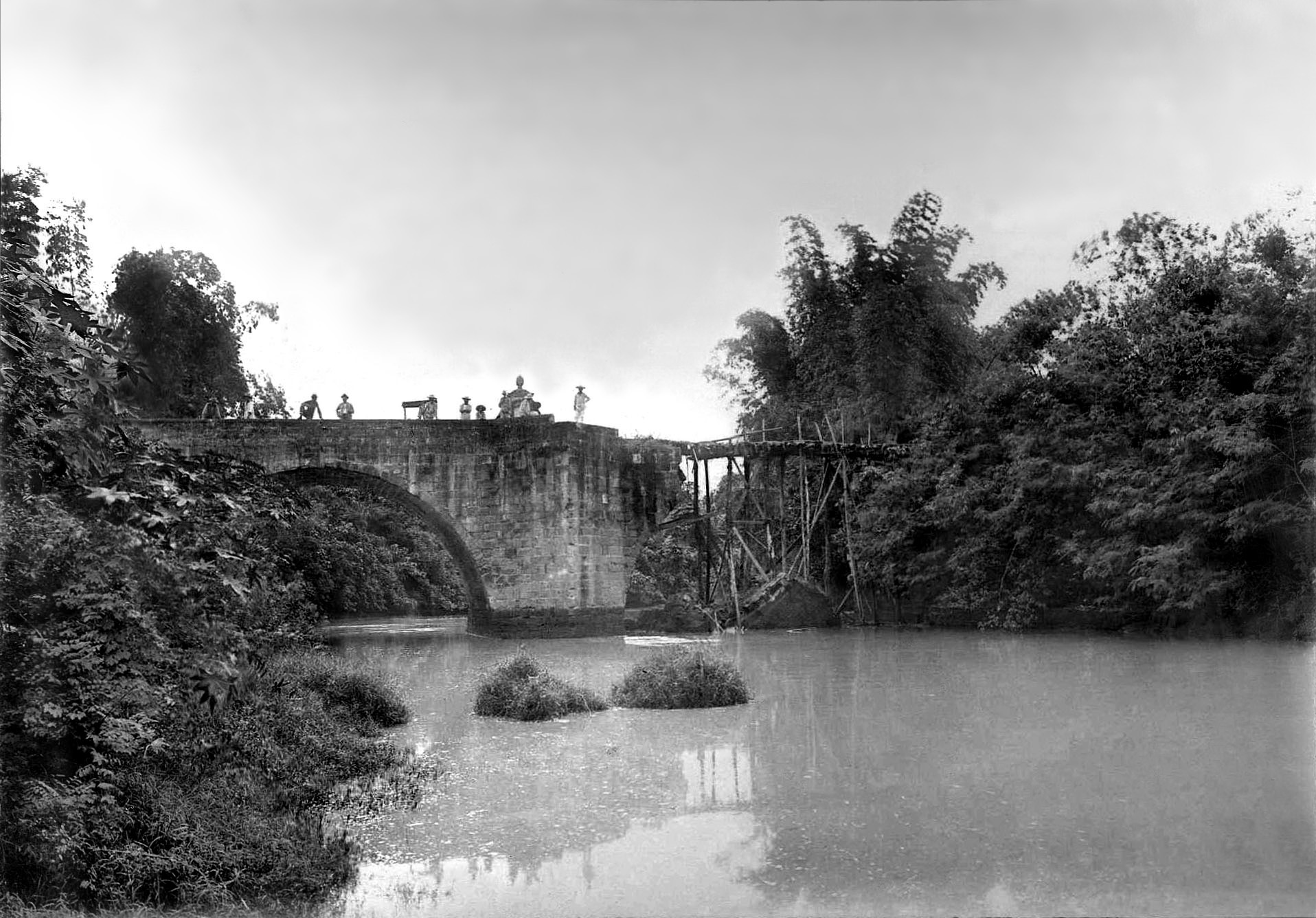
The Bridge of Isabel II in 1899 with the missing northern span dismantled during the Philippine revolution.

=== Battle of Imus ===
On September 3, 1896, during the Battle of Imus, the northern span of the bridge was dismantled by the Filipino revolutionaries as an offense tactic to combat the Spanish soldiers coming in from Manila. With the revolutionaries hidden behind trenches, the marching soldiers would not see the cut until they have traversed part of the span thus entrapping them. The tactic was a success resulting in the victory of the revolutionaries.

The broken span of the bridge was temporarily replaced by a wooden structure. It was later rebuilt during the American colonial period.

=== Recognition ===
After the completion of the bridge in 1857, a silver medal was awarded by Governor-General Ramon Montero, the successor of Manuel Crespo, to Matias Carbonell, the builder of the bridge.

In 1939, a historical marker was installed on the bridge by the Philippines Historical Committee, which is now the National Historical Commission of the Philippines.

== Renovation ==
The bridge was renovated during the mayorship of Ayong Maliksi (1988–1998). The cosmetic refurbishing was made possible through the joint efforts of the Pugad Lawin sa Imus, Association of the Barangay Captains of Imus, and the Cavite Historical Society-Imus Chapter headed by Cesar Virata.

With the town's adoption of the "Flag Capital" title, the stone rails were painted with the blue and red colors following their appearance on the Philippine flag, blue half above the red half. The flag colors alludes to Imus as the site where the present flag of the Philippines was first raised. The central sitting areas were repaired, painted and the wall tiled. A monument commemorating the Battle of Imus was erected between the bridge and the entrance to the Cuartel.

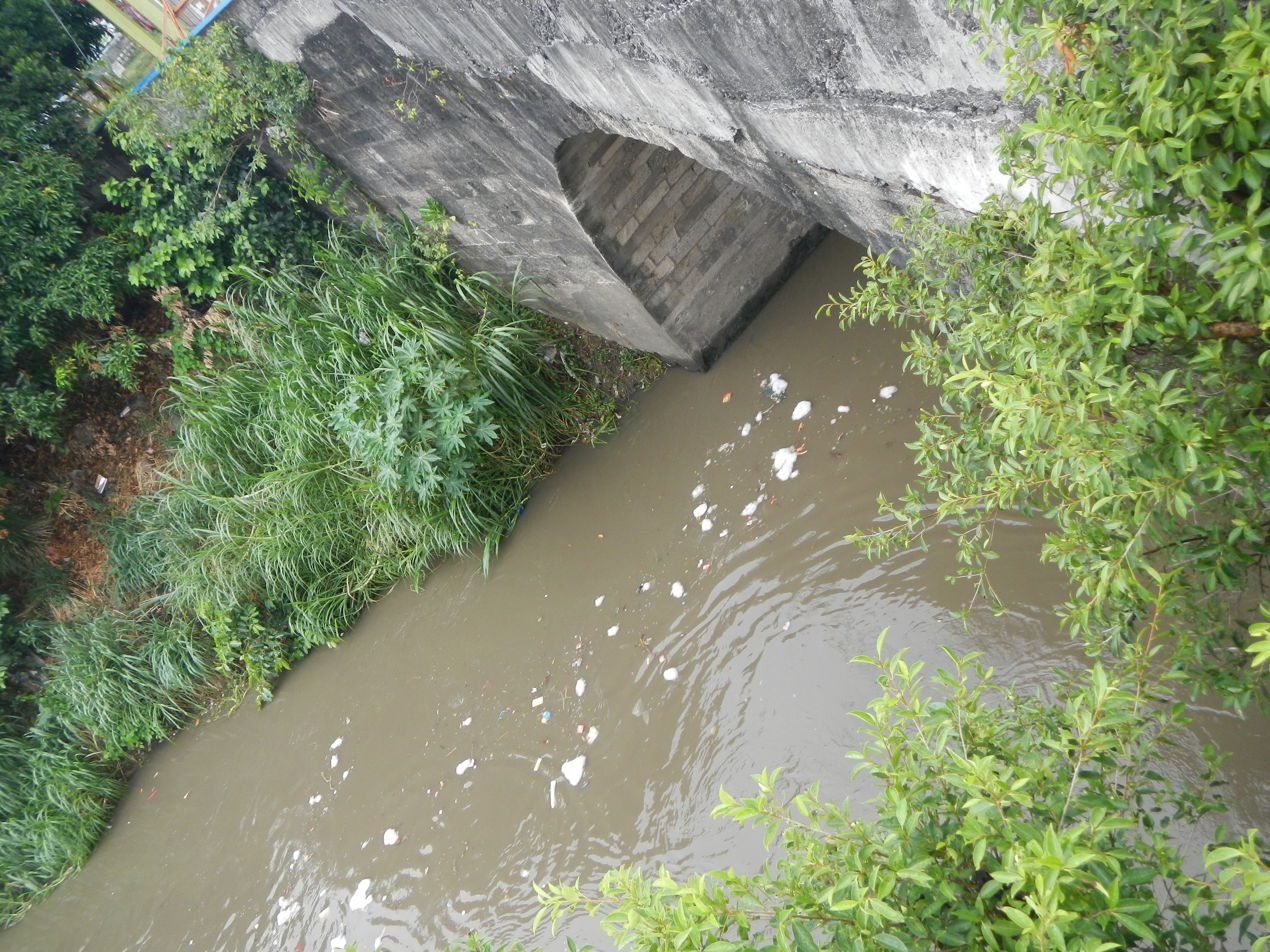
The stone arch as viewed from the sitting area.

== Viewing the bridge ==
The bridge is only visible from the deck of the bridge. There are no parks or public space where the side of the bridge and its stone arches can be viewed as the nearby land are private properties.

== See also ==
- List of Cultural Properties of the Philippines in CALABARZON
- Malagonlong Bridge
- Puente de España
- Jones Bridge
