= Pasig River Esplanade =

Esplanade in Manila, Philippines

- Esplanade
- Pasig: Bigyang Buhay Muli
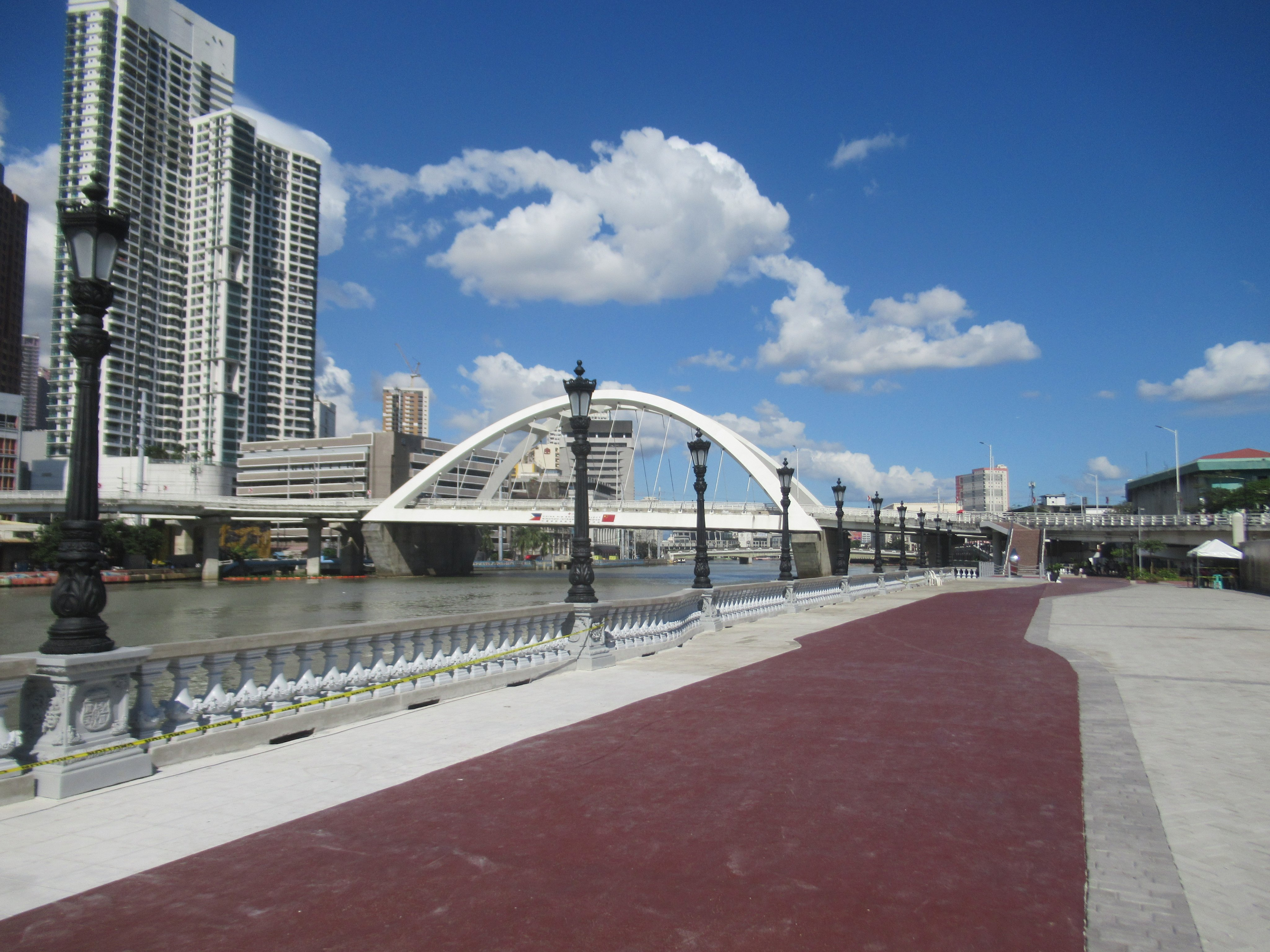
- The Pasig River Esplanade section near the Maestranza Wall in Intramuros. Shown in the background is the Binondo–Intramuros Bridge.
- Design: WTA Architecture and Design Studio; PGAA Creative Design
- Constructed: 2023–present
- Opened: January 17, 2024
- Length: 1,880 m (6,170 ft)
- Location: Pasig River, Manila
- Parking: Yes (Manila Post Office, Magallanes Drive)
- Public transit: Manila LRT: Carriedo; Central Terminal; Bus Routes: 5 6 7 14 17 23 24 25 27 34 38 40 42 48 49 52 53 54 Lawton; 5 6 7 14 17 34 38 40 49 52 53 54 Quiapo; 2 3 Hidalgo Street; P2P Bus Routes: Manila Multimodal Terminal; Pasig River Ferry Service: Escolta Ferry Station Lawton Ferry Station Quinta Ferry Station; Jeepneys, tricycles
- Website: pasigriver.com.ph

The Pasig River Esplanade, officially known as Pasig: Bigyang Buhay Muli (lit. 'Pasig: Give Life Again'), is a riverside esplanade in Manila, Philippines. It is planned to extend 25 kilometers (16 mi) along the Pasig River, traversing the cities of Manila, Mandaluyong, Makati, Pasig, and Taguig.

== History ==
=== Conceptualization ===
The project is an initiative of the administration of President Bongbong Marcos to rehabilitate and revitalize the Pasig River.

It was formally launched on July 23, 2025 through the signing of Executive Order 35, which created the Inter-Agency Council for the Pasig River Urban Development (IAC-PRUD) and obliged the new agency to formulate a Pasig River Urban Development Plan. By August 23, 2023, the IAC-PRUD completed the master plan for the project. The plan was made by WTA Architecture and Design Studio and PGAA Creative Design. On the following day, the project was formally launched as the Pasig Bigyan Buhay Muli (PBBM) project

It is a pet project of First Lady Liza Araneta-Marcos.

=== Construction ===
The Pasig River Esplanade has been constructed and opened in phases. The first 500 meters (1,600 ft) of the Pasig River Esplanade, which was dubbed as the "Showcase Area", was inaugurated on January 17, 2024. As of October 19, 2025, four phases has been completed.

The project so far also included the renovations of the Plaza Mexico, Maestranza Wall, and Fort Santiago.

Timeline of Pasig River Esplanade phases
Phase	Area	Length	Opened	Ref.
Phase 1A	Manila Post Office to Jones Bridge	500 m (1,600 ft)	January 17, 2024	
Phase 1B	Manila Post Office to Jones Bridge	500 m (1,600 ft)	January 17, 2024	
Phase 1C	Jones Bridge to Plaza Mexico	250 m (820 ft)	June 23, 2024	
Phase 2	Jones Bridge to Plaza Mexico	250 m (820 ft)	June 23, 2024	
Phase 3	Plaza Mexico to Fort Santiago	600 m (2,000 ft)	February 27, 2025	
Phase 4	Manila Post Office to Arroceros Park	530 m (1,740 ft)	October 19, 2025	
Total length		1,880 m (6,170 ft)		

== Gallery ==
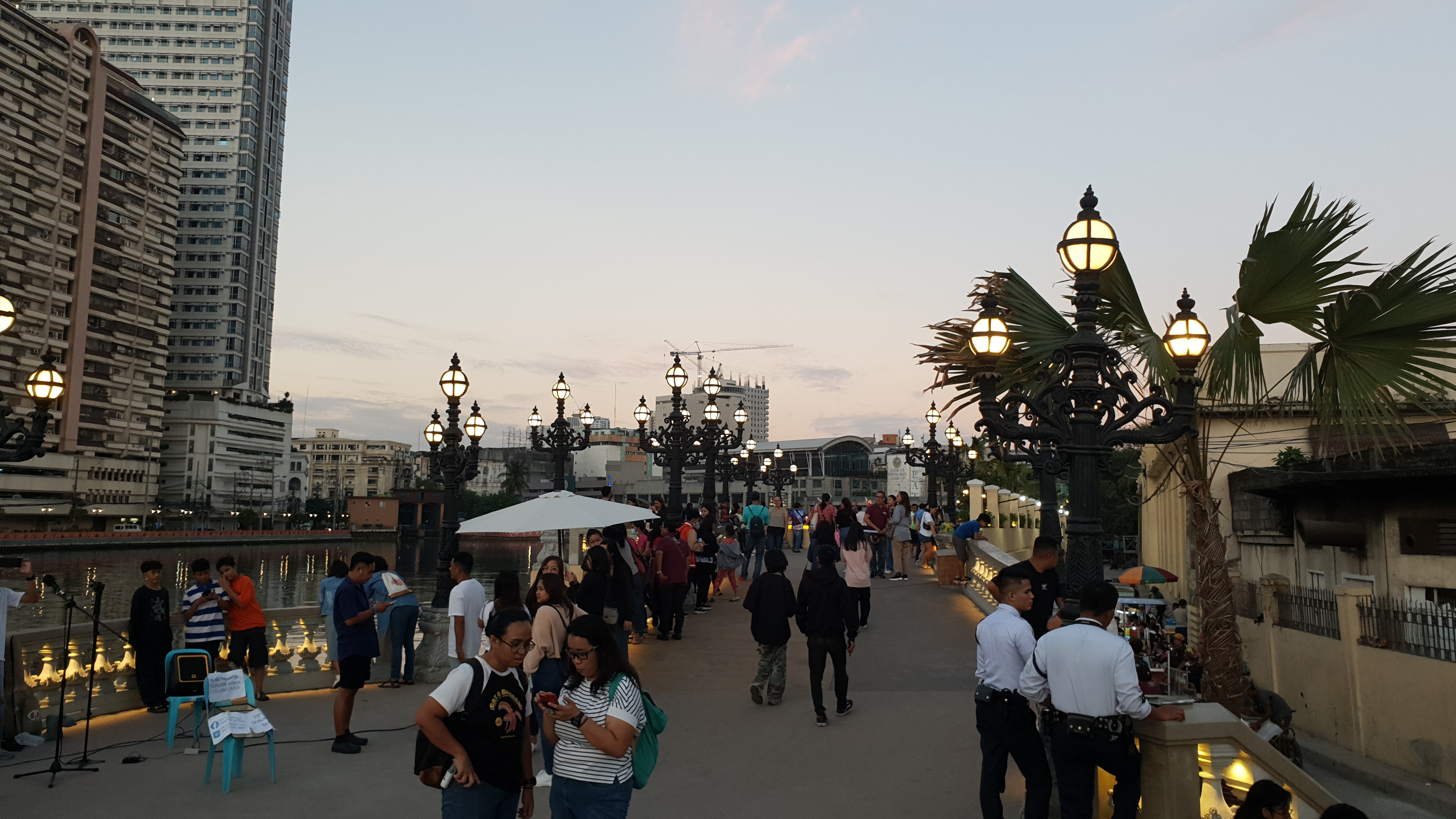
Phase 1 showcase area near the Manila Post Office Building

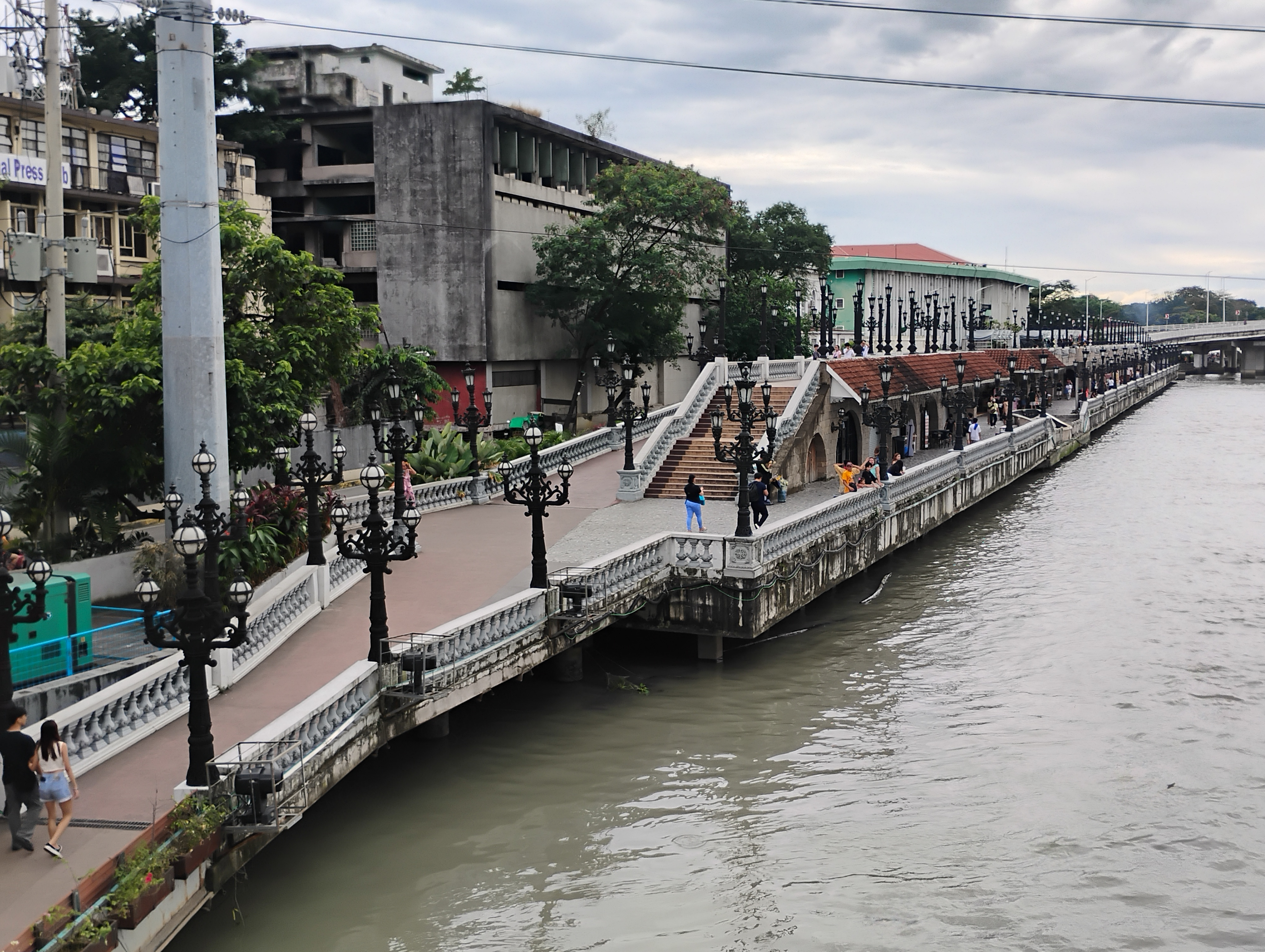
Phase 1C as seen from Jones Bridge

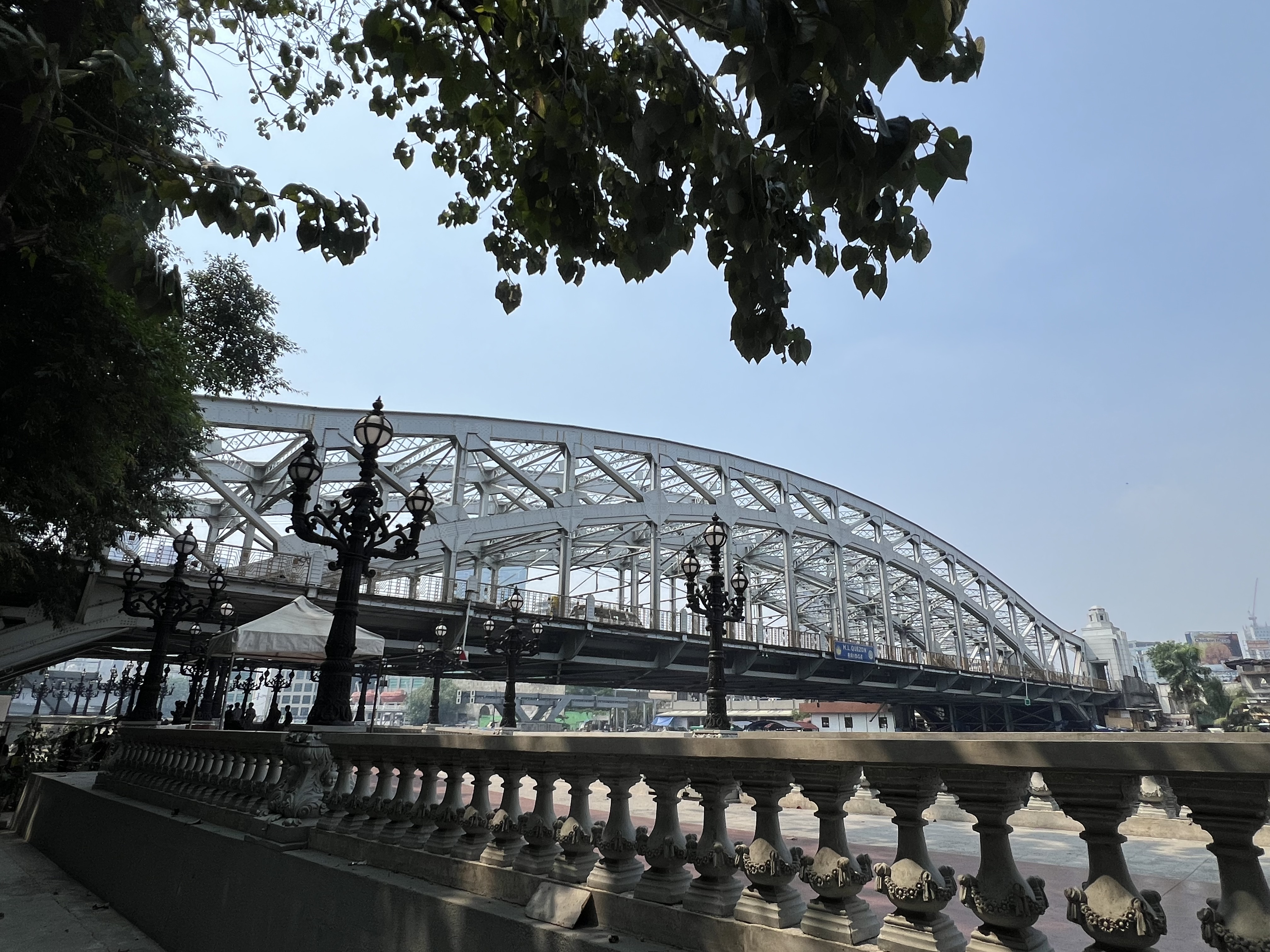
Quezon Bridge as seen from Phase 4 outside the Arroceros Urban Forest Park
