= Philippine Diamond Tower =

- Render of the Philippine Diamond Tower in Quezon City
- Interactive map of the Philippine Diamond Tower area

General information
- Status: Never built
- Type: Broadcast and observation tower
- Location: Quezon City, Philippines
- Coordinates: 14.6453157°N 121.03789642°E
- Cost: ₱41.4 billion
- Owner: Quezon City Government

Height
- Antenna spire: 612.0 m (2,008 ft)

The Philippine Diamond Tower was a proposed broadcast and observation tower to be built in the former Manila Seedling Bank property in the Triangle Park business district in Quezon City, Philippines. The groundbreaking for the tower was initially scheduled to take place October 12, 2014, in line with Quezon City's 75th foundation anniversary. Construction of the tower was planned to take place in mid 2015 and was planned to be completed in 2019.

The tower's height was planned to be at 612.0 m (2,008 ft), to signify the country's Independence Day which is celebrated annually on June 12. It is set to be completed in 3 years and will be open to the public by 2017 - 2018. Philippine Diamond Tower is planned to be a major landmark not only of Manila, but the entire Philippines. A city ordinance was planned to be enacted to support the development of the tower.

In February 2016, the Japanese government was reportedly interested to invest in the project through The Corporation for the Overseas Development of Japan's ICT and Postal Services with a local subsidiary. China was also reportedly interested in the project and was likely to bid. The tower was expected to cost around ₱41.4 billion and was projected to be completed by 2019.

The tower was never built.

== See also ==
- Pagcor Tower
