= La Mesa Watershed Reservation =

Protected area in Metro Manila, Philippines

- Novaliches Watershed
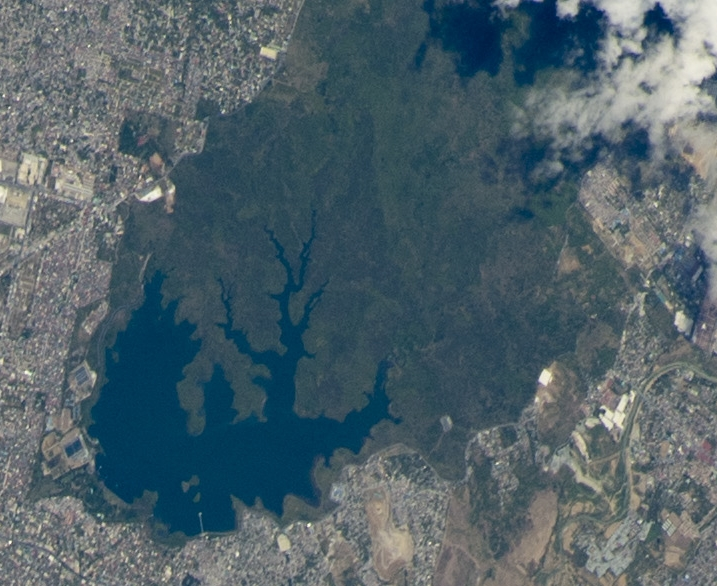
- The La Mesa Watershed Reservation as viewed from space. 2016

- Location within Metro Manila
- Location: Primarily in Quezon City and part of Caloocan and Rizal
- Coordinates: 14°44′37″N 121°6′3″E
- Area: 2,659 hectares (6,570 acres)
- Established: July 25, 2007; 18 years ago
- Visitors: 300,000 (in 2015)
- Governing body: Department of Environment and Natural Resources; Metropolitan Waterworks and Sewerage System

The La Mesa Watershed Reservation is a protected area that preserves the only major watershed in Metro Manila, Philippines. Also known as the Novaliches Watershed, it contains the last remaining rainforest of its size in Metro Manila surrounding the La Mesa Dam and Reservoir, the primary source of potable drinking water for 12 million residents in the Manila metropolitan area. The area is under jointly controlled and supervised by the Department of Environment and Natural Resources and the Metropolitan Waterworks and Sewerage System. It was established in 2007 through Proclamation No. 1336 issued by President Gloria Macapagal Arroyo.

== Geography ==
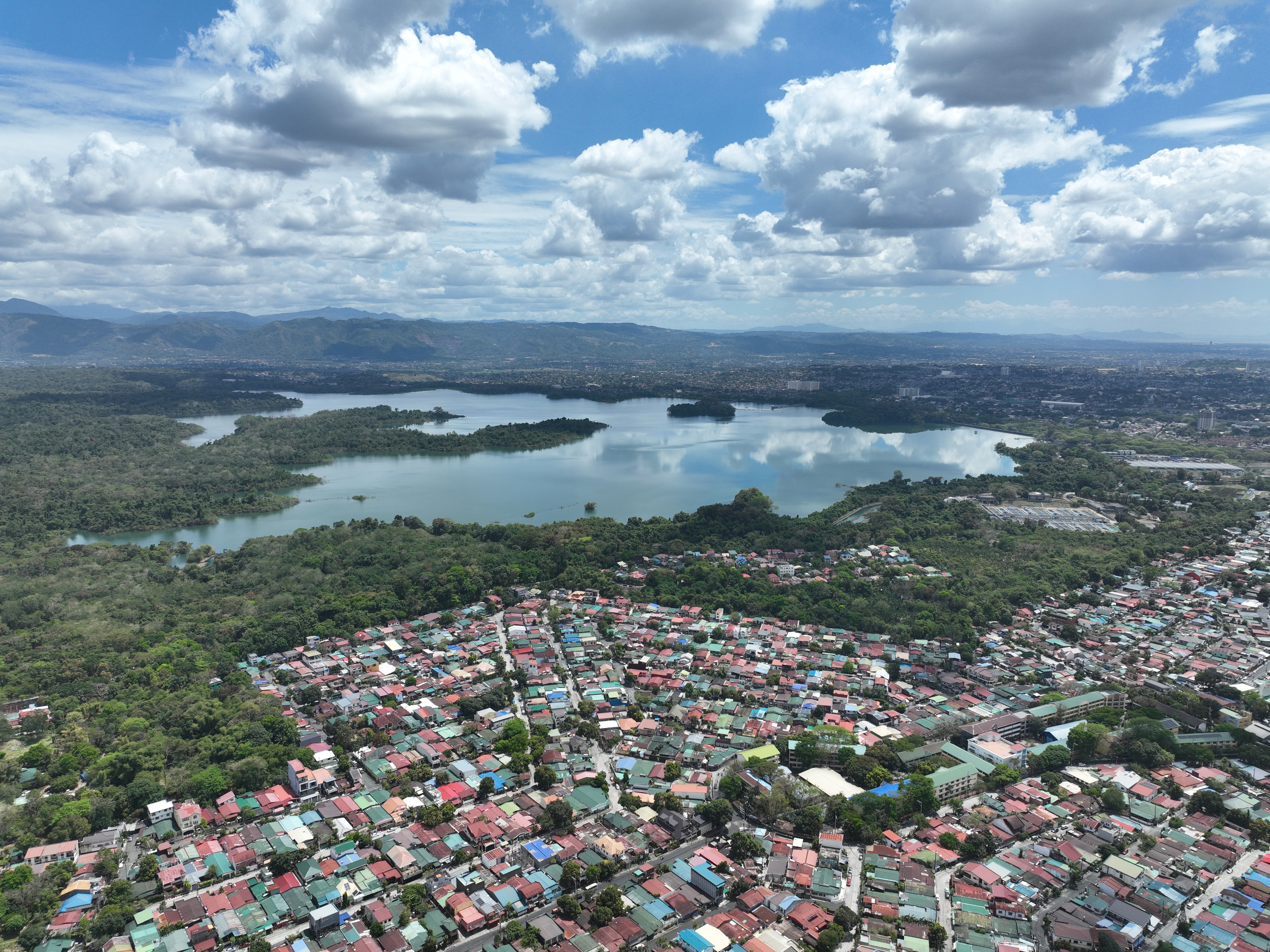
Aerial view of the La Mesa Dam and Reservoir wit the Greater Lagro Area settlement in the foreground.

The La Mesa Watershed encompasses an area of 2,659 hectares (6,570 acres) in the northern fringes of Quezon City, Caloocan and Rodriguez, Rizal. It is situated on a flat-topped hill or mesa at the foot of the southern Sierra Madre mountain range west of the Marikina Valley. It is about 9 kilometers (5.6 mi) north from the center of Quezon City in Diliman, and some 20 kilometers (12 mi) northeast from the center of Manila in Rizal Park.

The highest elevation in Quezon City is in the watershed's northern tip at 250 meters (820 ft) above sea level. It centers on the 700-hectare (1,700-acre) La Mesa Dam and Reservoir in Novaliches, an artificial lake which was created in 1929 as part of Manila's Ipo–Novaliches–San Juan water system under the American colonial government. The surrounding 2,000-hectare (4,900-acre) forest contains more than 50 kilometers (31 mi) of nature trails and serves as the lungs of Metro Manila, providing it with clean air. It also contains the 33-hectare (82-acre) ecological park known as the La Mesa Eco Park. This park located at the southern edges of the watershed in East Fairview is administered by the Quezon City Parks Development and Administration Department and was opened in 2003.

The Tullahan River which passes through Malabon and Navotas starts from the La Mesa Watershed Reservation. It flows until Manila Bay.

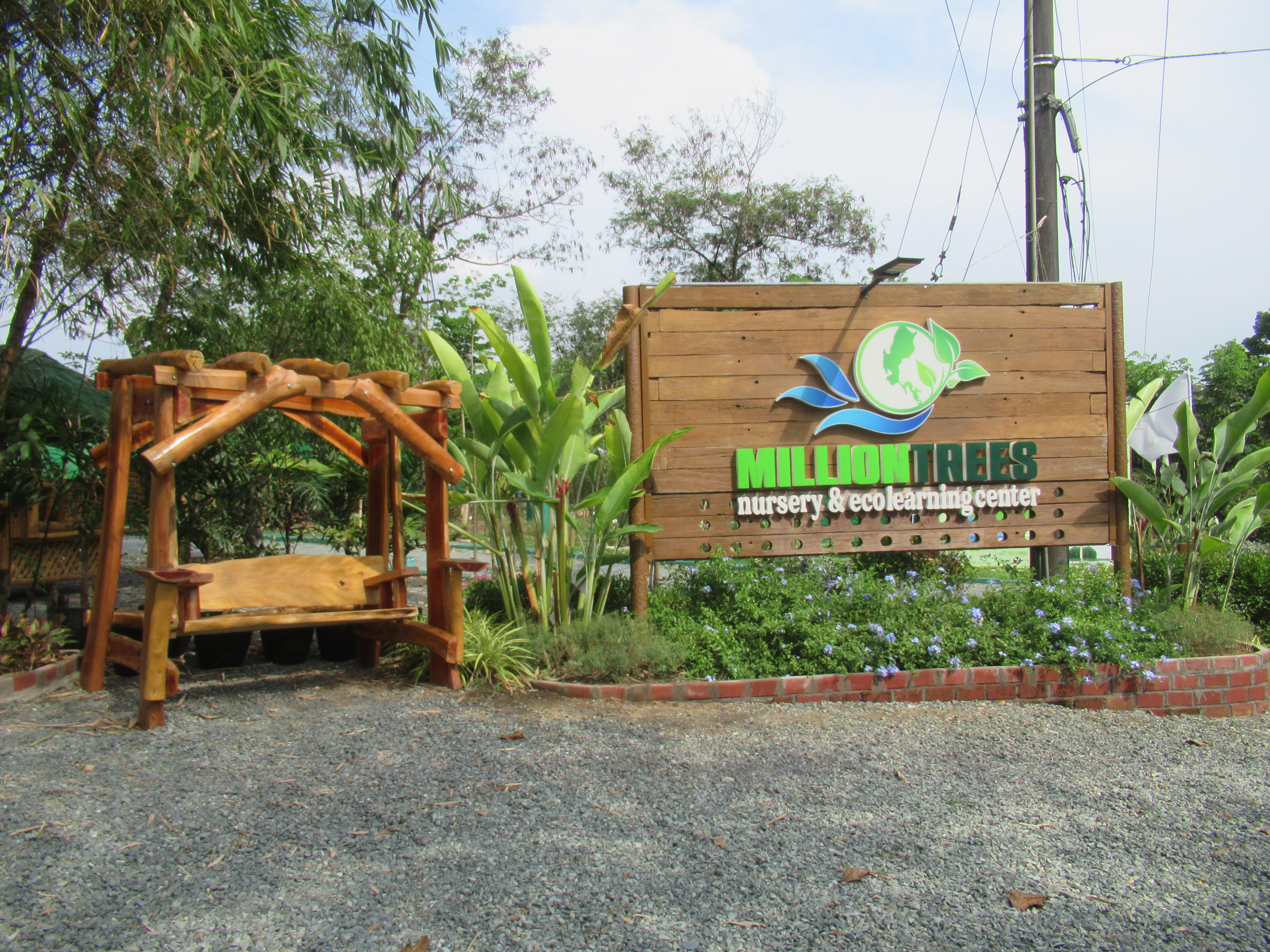
Million Trees Nursery and Eco Learning Center - Eddie's Barn

== Tourism ==
In 2015, it was reported that 300 thousand people visit the La Mesa Watershed Reservation annually according to park officials. The protected area also has 50 kilometers (31 mi) of nature trails.

== Biodiversity ==
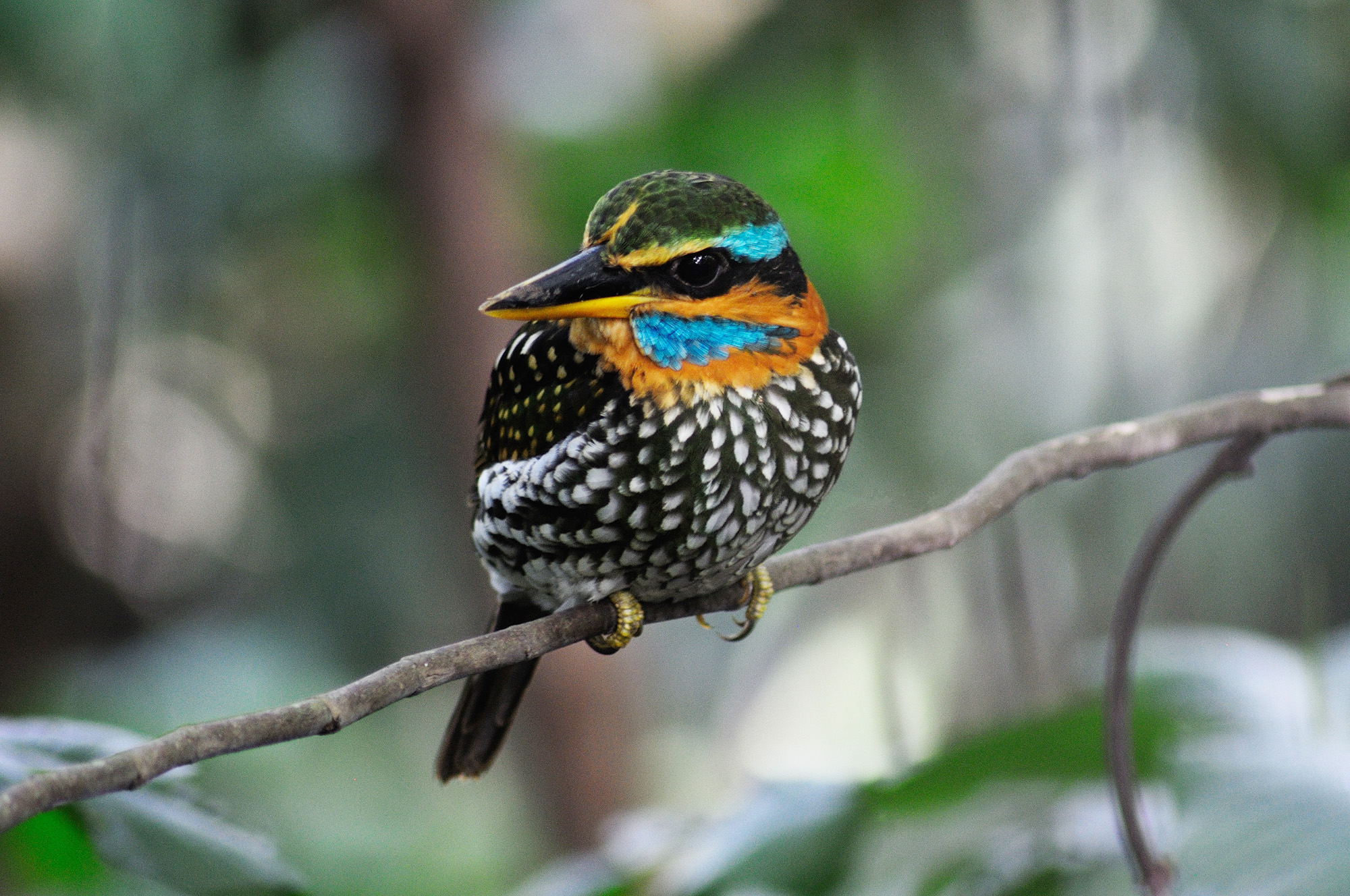
A male spotted wood kingfisher at the La Mesa Watershed Reservation

The La Mesa Watershed comprises a variety of ecosystems that is home to many indigenous and endemic species of flora and fauna. Approximately 1,800 hectares (4,400 acres) are under forest cover and 300 hectares (740 acres) are open areas, pastures and areas under cultivation. Several portions of the La Mesa reservoir are shallow with exposed mudflats, swampforest, reed and other swamp vegetation. Its forest serves as an important breeding area for a variety of wildlife species and birds such as the little heron, black-crowned night heron, osprey, Japanese sparrowhawk, plain bush-hen, common moorhen, Eurasian coot, Philippine coucal, Philippine nightjar, island swiftlet, spotted wood kingfisher, common kingfisher, white-collared kingfisher, Philippine pygmy woodpecker, barn swallow, pied triller, ashy minivet, Philippine bulbul, black-naped oriole, Oriental magpie robin, Arctic warbler, grey-streaked flycatcher, pied fantail, yellow-bellied whistler, grey wagtail, brown shrike, olive-backed sunbird, and lowland white-eye.

The most common tree species found in the reservation are Malay beechwood, earleaf acacia, acacia mangium, narra, mahogany, teak, ipil-ipil, alibangbang and bangkal.

== Threats ==
Threats to the watershed's biodiversity come from land conversion and deforestation from illegal harvesting of forest products. In 2014, the La Mesa park ranger recorded a total of 25 informal settler families living within the reservation who engage in slash-and-burn cultivation or kaingin. A portion of the watershed was also reportedly sold as housing for employees of the Metropolitan Waterworks and Sewerage System which was flagged by the Commission on Audit. Former Environment Secretary Gina Lopez cancelled the environmental compliance certificate for the sale in December 2016.

The Manila Seedling Bank conducted a five-year reforestation program at the watershed from 1978 to 1983. In a 2013 vulnerability assessment by scientist Cristino Tiburan, the La Mesa Watershed Reservation was found to be prone to erosion and landslide.

== See also ==
- Angat Watershed Forest Reserve
