= Puente Colgante (Manila) =

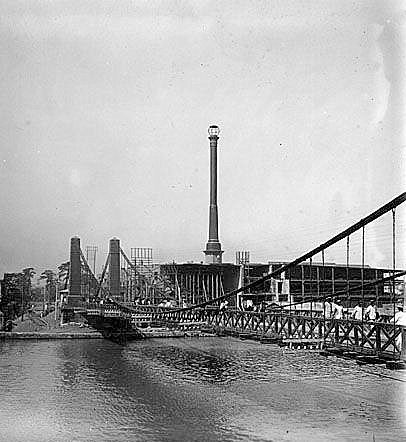
- Puente de Clavería as seen on October 1, 1875
- Coordinates: 14°35′43.8″N 120°58′55.5″E
- Carries: Pedestrians and carriages
- Crosses: Pasig River
- Locale: Manila
- Other name: Clavería Bridge (before 1930s)
- Named for: Narciso Clavería y Zaldúa, 1st Count of Manila
- Owner: Ynchausti y Compañia; City of Manila
- Preceded by: Puente de Convalecencia (1880)
- Followed by: Puente Grande (1852); Puente de España (1875); Jones Bridge (1916)

Characteristics
- Design: Suspension bridge
- Material: Iron structure, wooden deck
- Total length: 110 m (360 ft)
- Width: 7 m (23 ft)
- No. of spans: One
- Piers in water: None

History
- Designer: Matia, Menchacatorre y Cía.
- Constructed by: Ynchausti y Compañia
- Construction start: 1849
- Construction end: 1852
- Opened: January 4, 1852
- Replaced by: Quezon Bridge (1939)

Location
- Interactive map of Puente Colgante

The Puente Colgante (lit. 'Hanging Bridge'), originally called Puente de Clavería (lit. 'Clavería Bridge'), was a suspension bridge that connected the Manila districts of Quiapo and Ermita across the Pasig River in the Philippines. Designed by Matia, Menchacatorre y Cía. and completed in 1852, it was the first modern wire-cable suspension bridge in Asia and the first toll bridge of its kind in the Philippines. It was replaced by the Quezon Bridge in 1939.

== History ==
Puente Colgante, the second bridge built over the Pasig River, was the first wire-cable suspension bridge built in Asia when it was completed in 1852. It was built and owned by Ynchausti y Compañia, the business headed by Jose Joaquín de Ynchausti. He commissioned the bridge design from Spanish-Basque engineer Matias Menchacatorre. The bridge was first named Puente de Clavería, likely in honor of the Governor-General of the Philippines, Narciso Clavería, who served from 1844 to 1849.

The suspension bridge measured 110 meters (360 ft) long and 7 meters (23 ft) wide and had two lanes that allowed passage of horses and carabao-drawn carriages. It was also opened for pedestrians travelling on foot between Quiapo and Intramuros and nearby areas.

In 1854, Ynchausti brought together the Ynchausti family holdings under the above name. A Basque Spaniard born in Cádiz, de Ynchausti migrated to the Philippines in the second quarter of the nineteenth century and built a business empire. In 1889, Ynchausti y Compañia was the largest company in the Philippines.

Ynchausti y Cia was originally granted a franchise to operate the bridge as a toll bridge for 90 years. On June 9, 1911, the bridge was bought by the city of Manila for ₱42,500. Tolls were subsequently abolished on June 15, 1911. Carromata traffic was prohibited when an inspection of the bridge deemed such traffic unsafe. Automobile traffic was never permitted.

The 20th-century Filipino writer Nick Joaquin described the bridge as it was in the 1870s: "Across the city’s river now arched … the amazing Puente Colgante, suspended in the air, like a salute to the age of science and engineering. The Industrial Age found its expression in the Philippines in the form of a bridge unparalleled throughout Asia."

Historians dispute local traditions that say the bridge was designed by Gustave Eiffel, who designed the Eiffel Tower in Paris. (This is also asserted about the Puente de Ayala.) They note the original bridge has been documented as designed by a Basque. (In addition, the 1930s work was performed a decade after Eiffel died in 1923.)

Puente Colgante was later replaced by the Quezon Bridge in 1939.
