= Quezon Bridge =

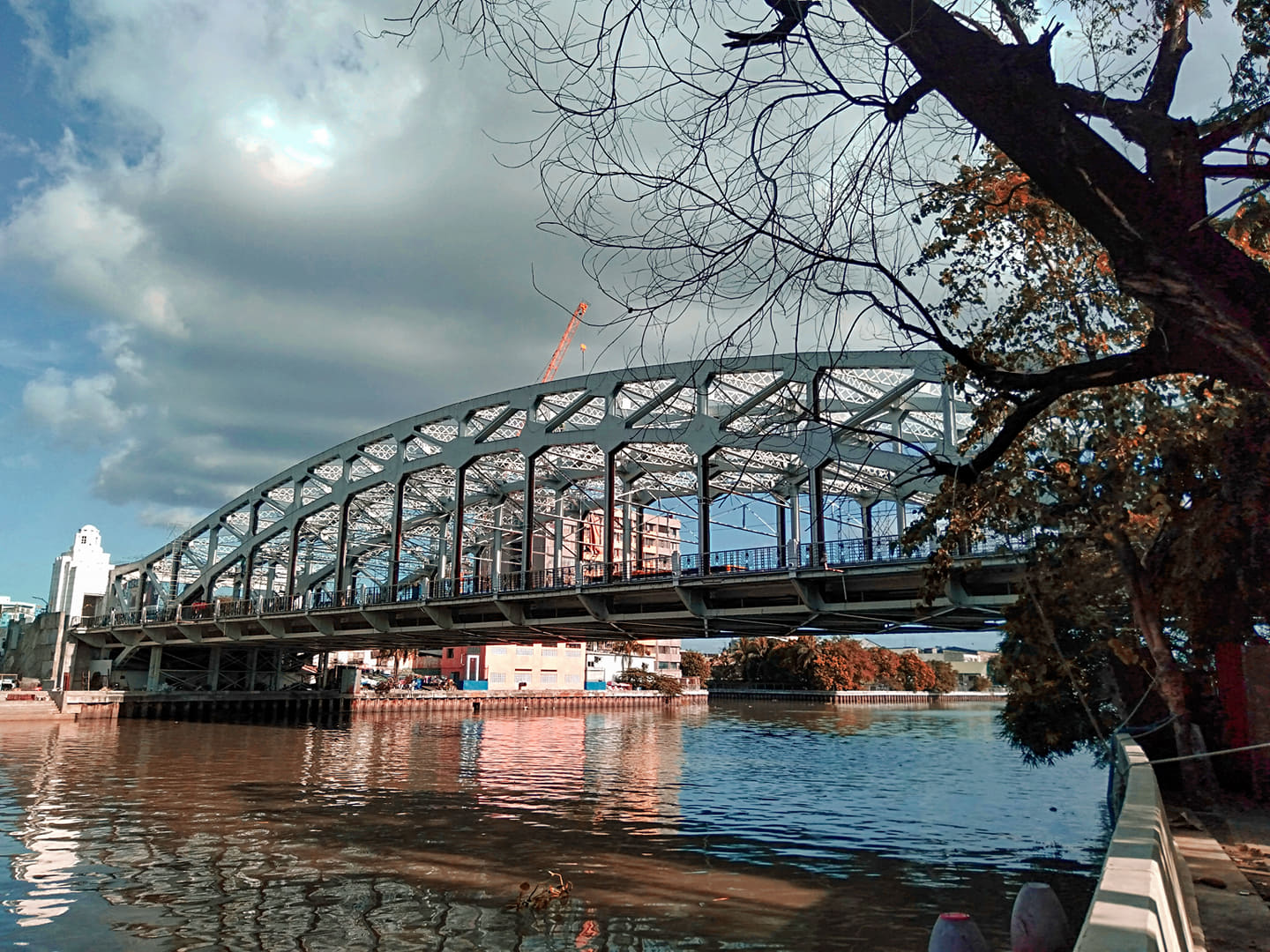
- Quezon Bridge in 2020
- Coordinates: 14°35′43.8″N 120°58′55.5″E
- Carries: 4 lanes of N170, vehicles and pedestrians
- Crosses: Pasig River
- Locale: Manila, Philippines
- Official name: Manuel L. Quezon Memorial Bridge
- Other name: M. Quezon Bridge
- Named for: Manuel L. Quezon
- Maintained by: Department of Public Works and Highways
- Preceded by: MacArthur Bridge
- Followed by: Ayala Bridge

Characteristics
- Design: Arch / PSC girder bridge
- Material: Steel & "Pre-stressed" Reinforced concrete
- Total length: 447 m (1,467 ft)
- Width: 22.50 m (74 ft)
- Traversable?: Yes
- No. of spans: 8
- Load limit: 15 t (15,000 kg) (Formerly 5 t (5,000 kg))
- No. of lanes: 4 (2 per direction)

History
- Constructed by: Pedro Siochi and Company
- Construction end: 1939
- Rebuilt: 1946
- Replaces: Puente Colgante

Location
- Interactive map of Quezon Bridge

The Quezon Bridge is a combined arch and prestressed concrete girder bridge crossing the Pasig River between Quezon Boulevard in Quiapo and Padre Burgos Avenue in Ermita in Manila, Philippines.

Quezon Bridge was built to take the much greater and heavier 20th-century vehicular traffic than the 19th-century Puente Colgante was designed for, which it replaced. It was constructed in 1939 under the supervision of the engineering firm Pedro Siochi and Company. The bridge was designed as an Art Deco-style arch bridge inspired by the design of the Sydney Harbour Bridge. It was named in honor of Manuel Luis Quezon, the President of the Philippines at the time of its construction.

It was damaged during World War II and subsequently rebuilt in 1946. Due to increasing utilization, age, and, at one point, fire damage in 2014, it has been subject to frequent repairs, reinforcement, and retrofits through the years. As a result, the bridge became restricted only to light vehicles. Its last major reconstruction was done in 1996. In February 2022, new LED lights were installed on the bridge.

== In popular culture ==
The bridge is the establishing location in the first episode and appears in other episodes of the Philippine action series FPJ's Batang Quiapo starring Coco Martin.

== Gallery ==
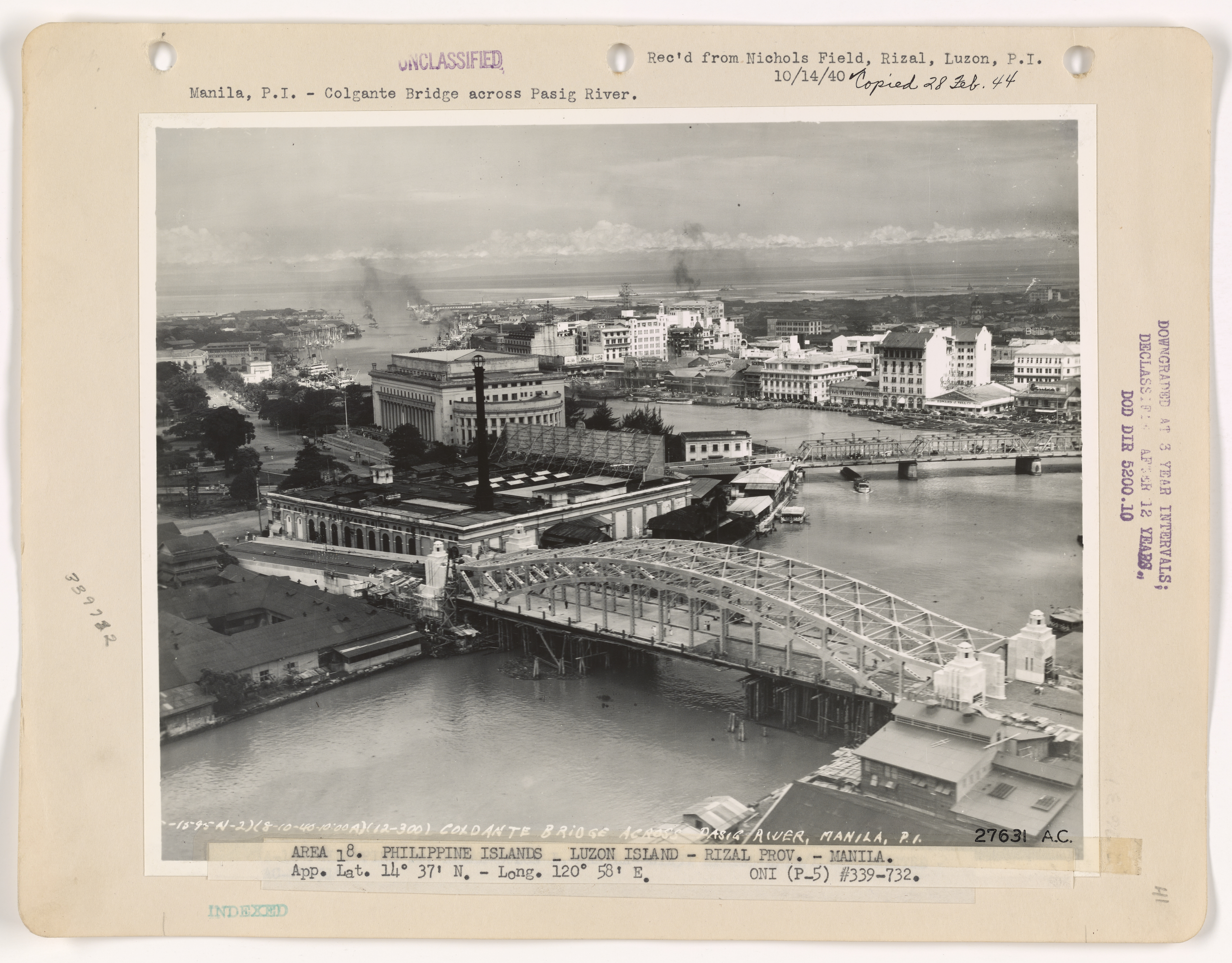
The bridge in 1940

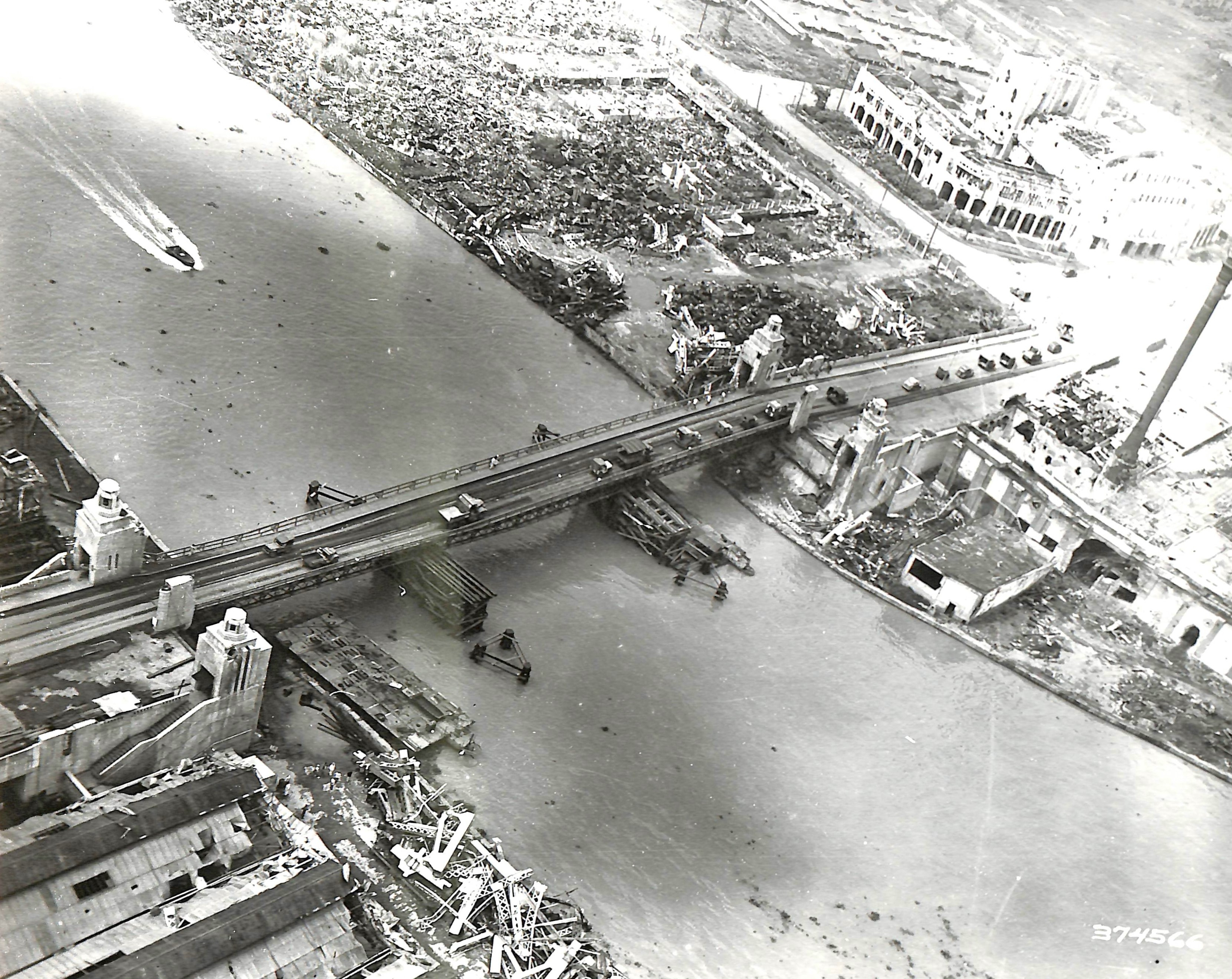
The bridge in war-devastated Manila in July 1945

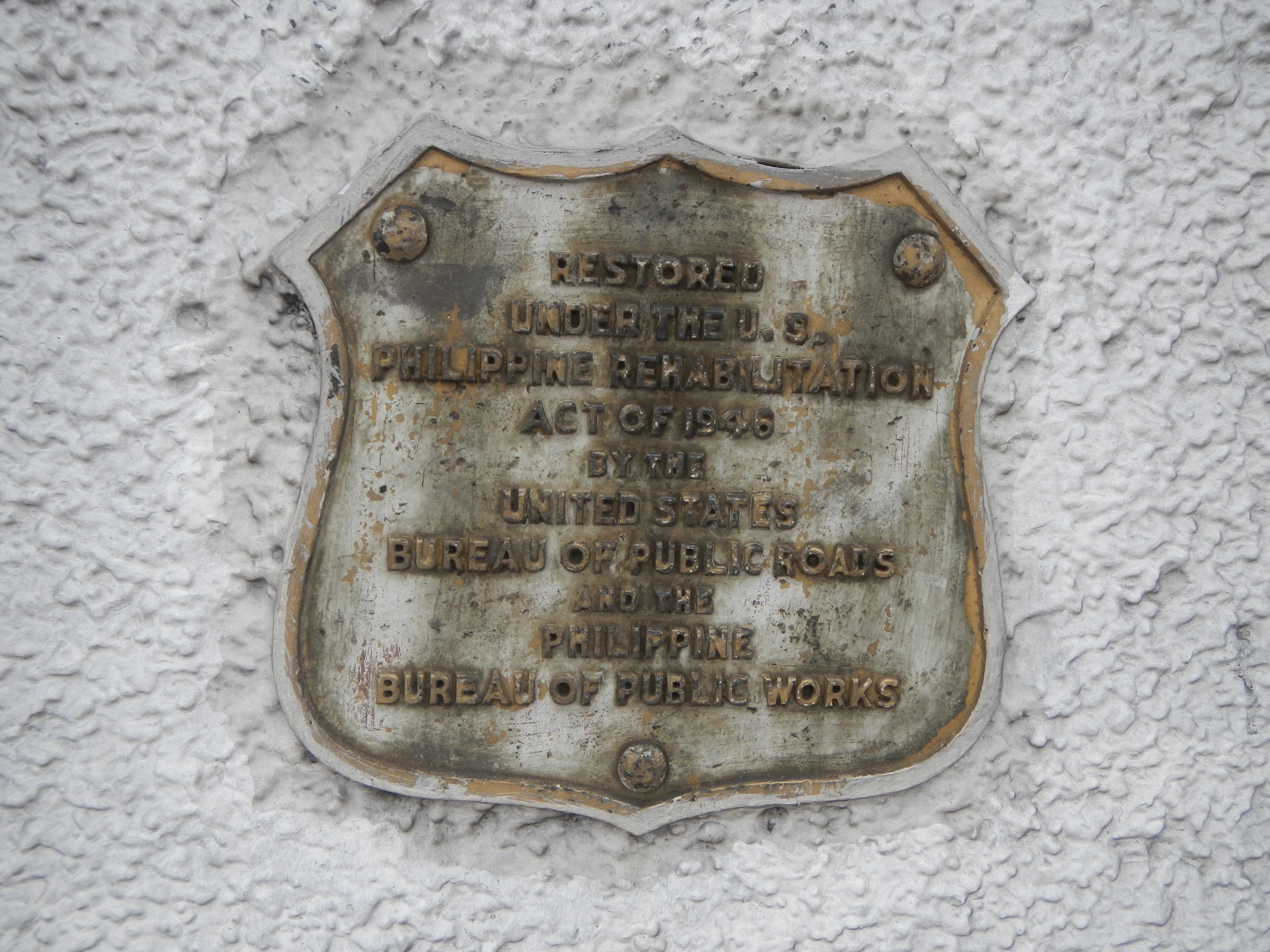
Marker of its rehabilitation

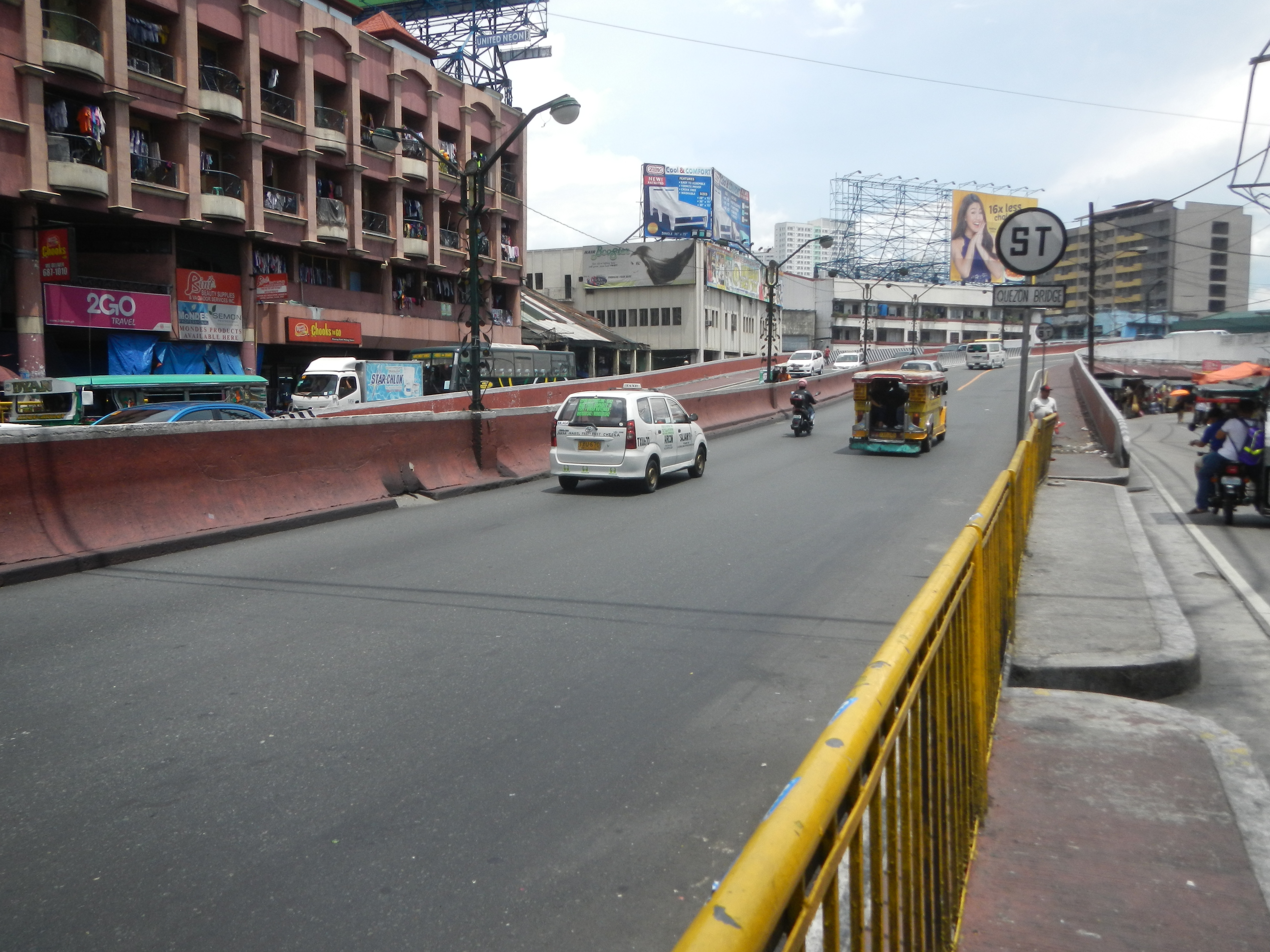
The bridge from Quiapo

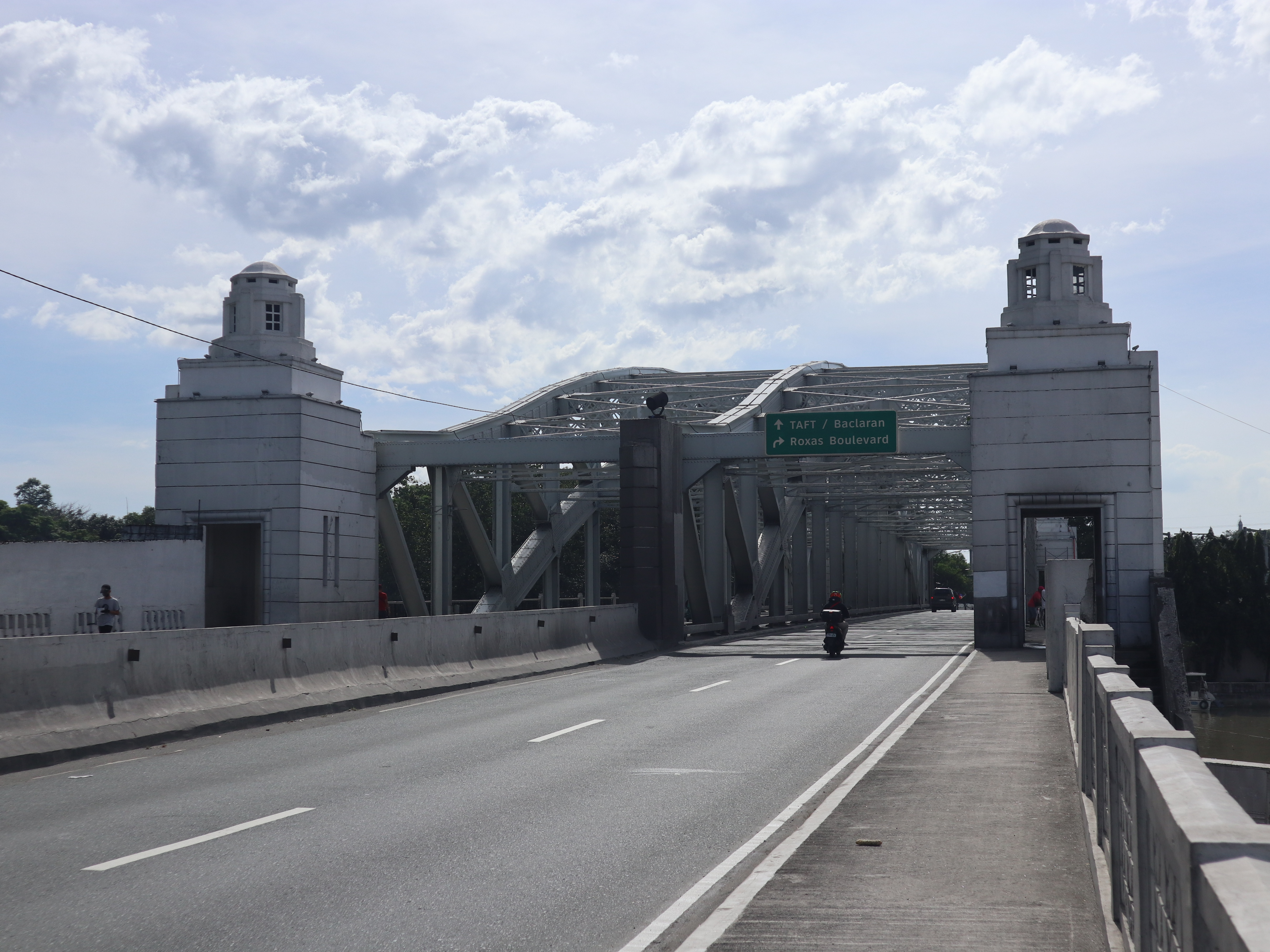
The bridge southbound

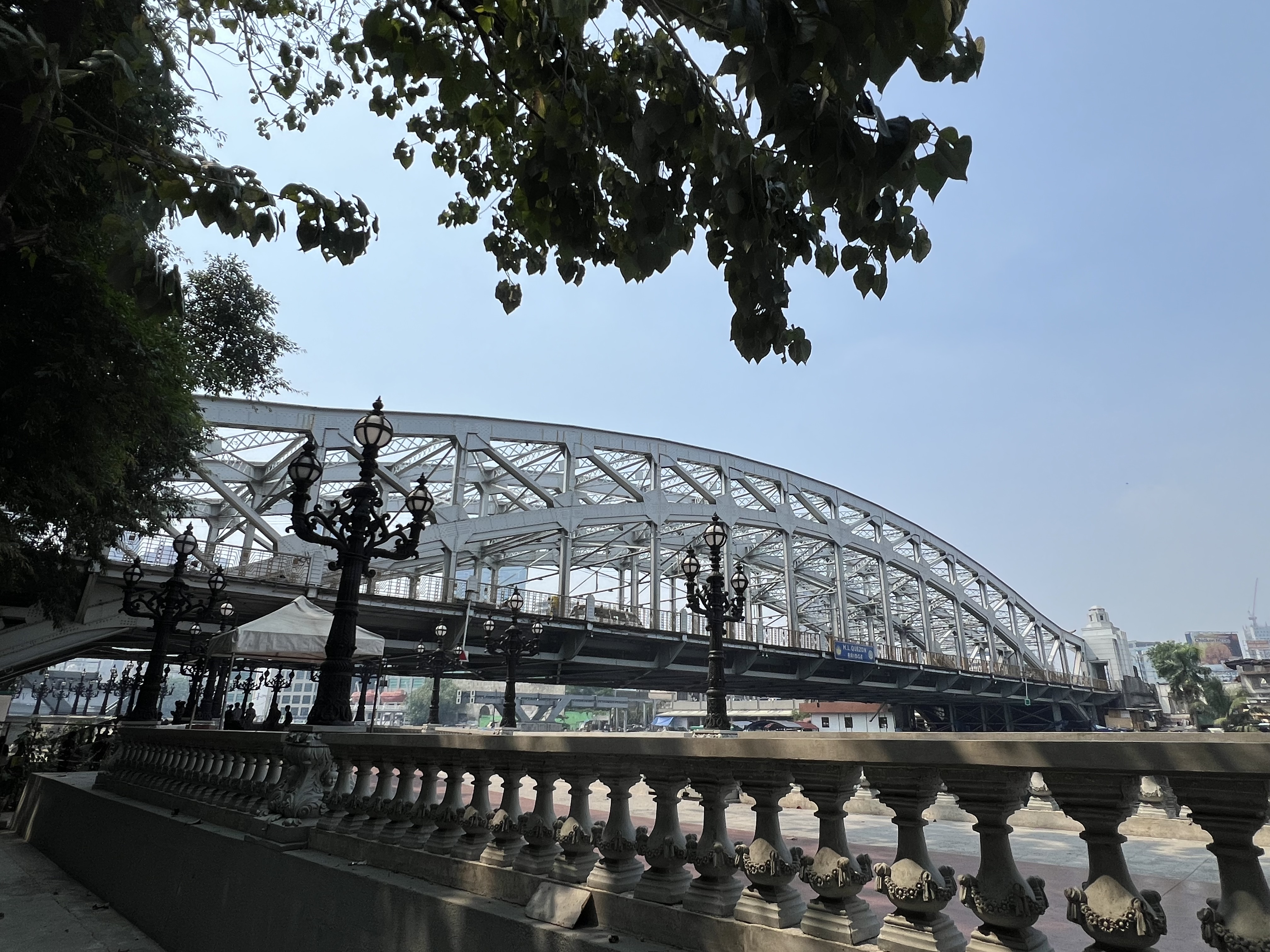
As seen from the Pasig River Esplanade located outside the Arroceros Urban Forest Park

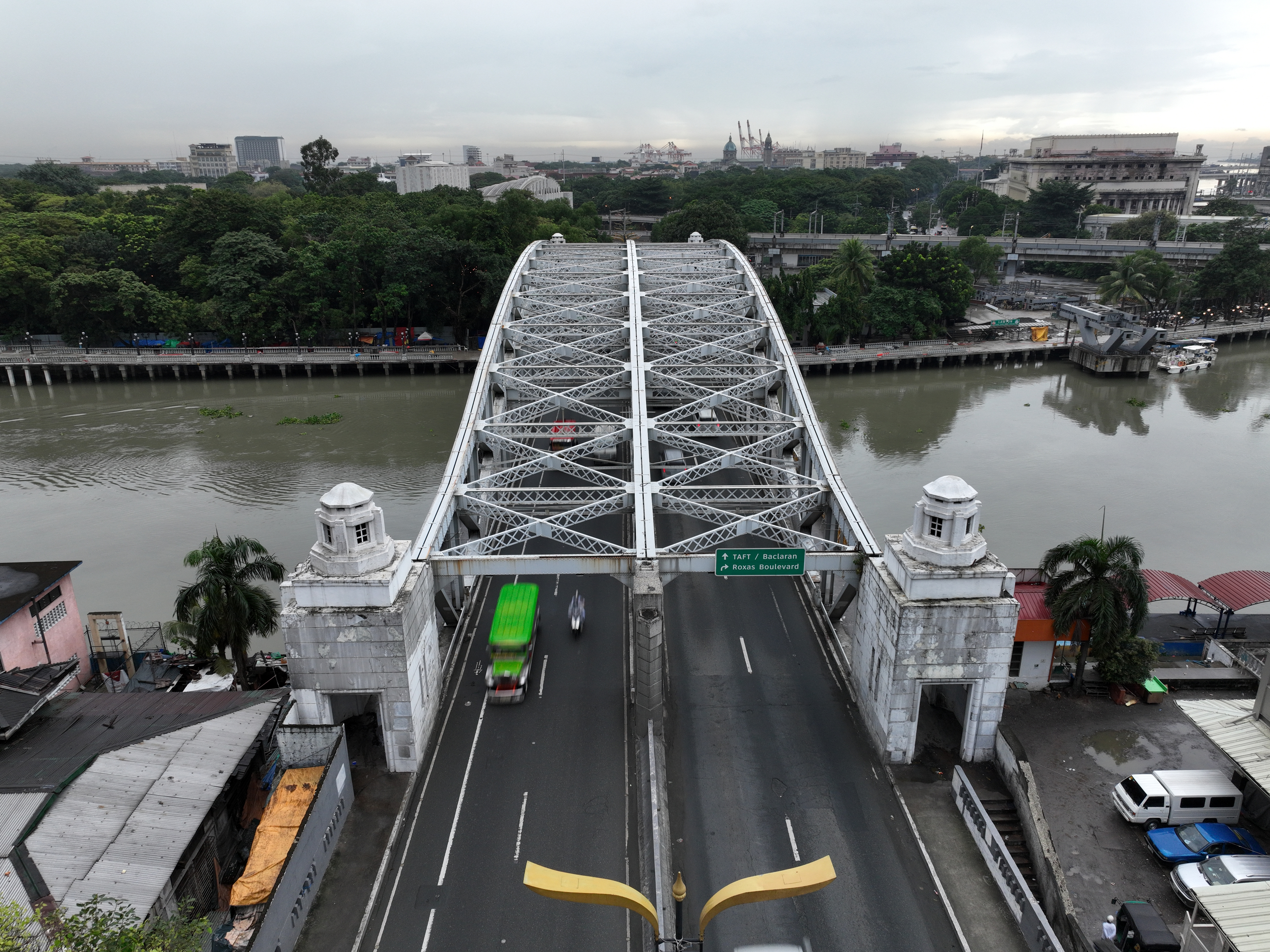
Drone view of the bridge from the northern bank
