= Arroceros Urban Forest Park =

Urban forest park in Manila, Philippines

Coordinates: 14°35′39″N 120°58′55″E

Arroceros Forest Park
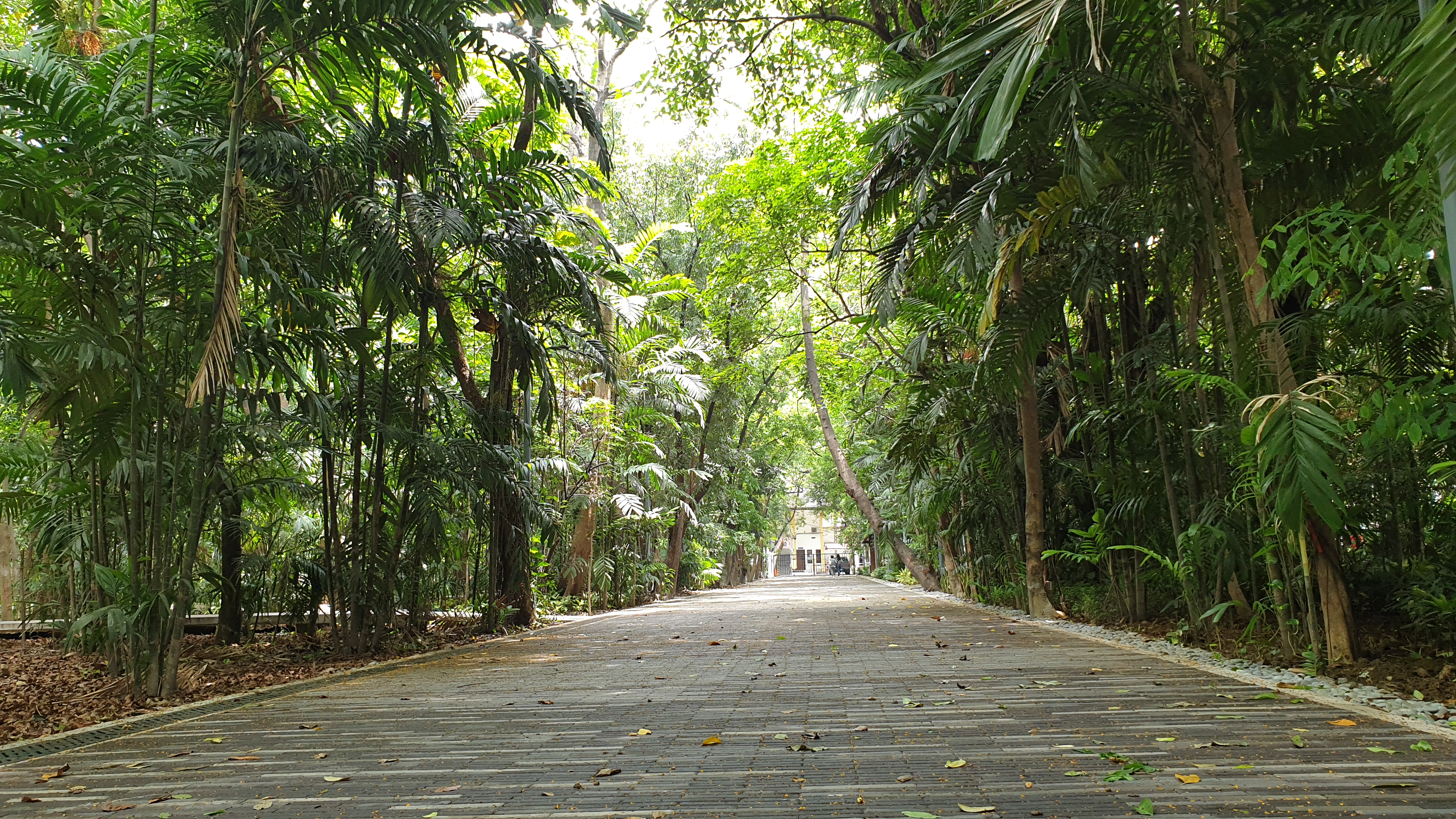
- A wide paved path inside the Arroceros Forest Park
- Interactive map of Arroceros Forest Park
- Type: Urban forest
- Location: Ermita, Manila, Philippines
- Area: 2.72 hectares (27,200 m^{2})
- Created: 1993
- Operator: City Government of Manila; Winner Foundation
- Status: Opened
- Public transit: Central Terminal; Lawton Ferry Station; Manila Multimodal Terminal (Lawton)

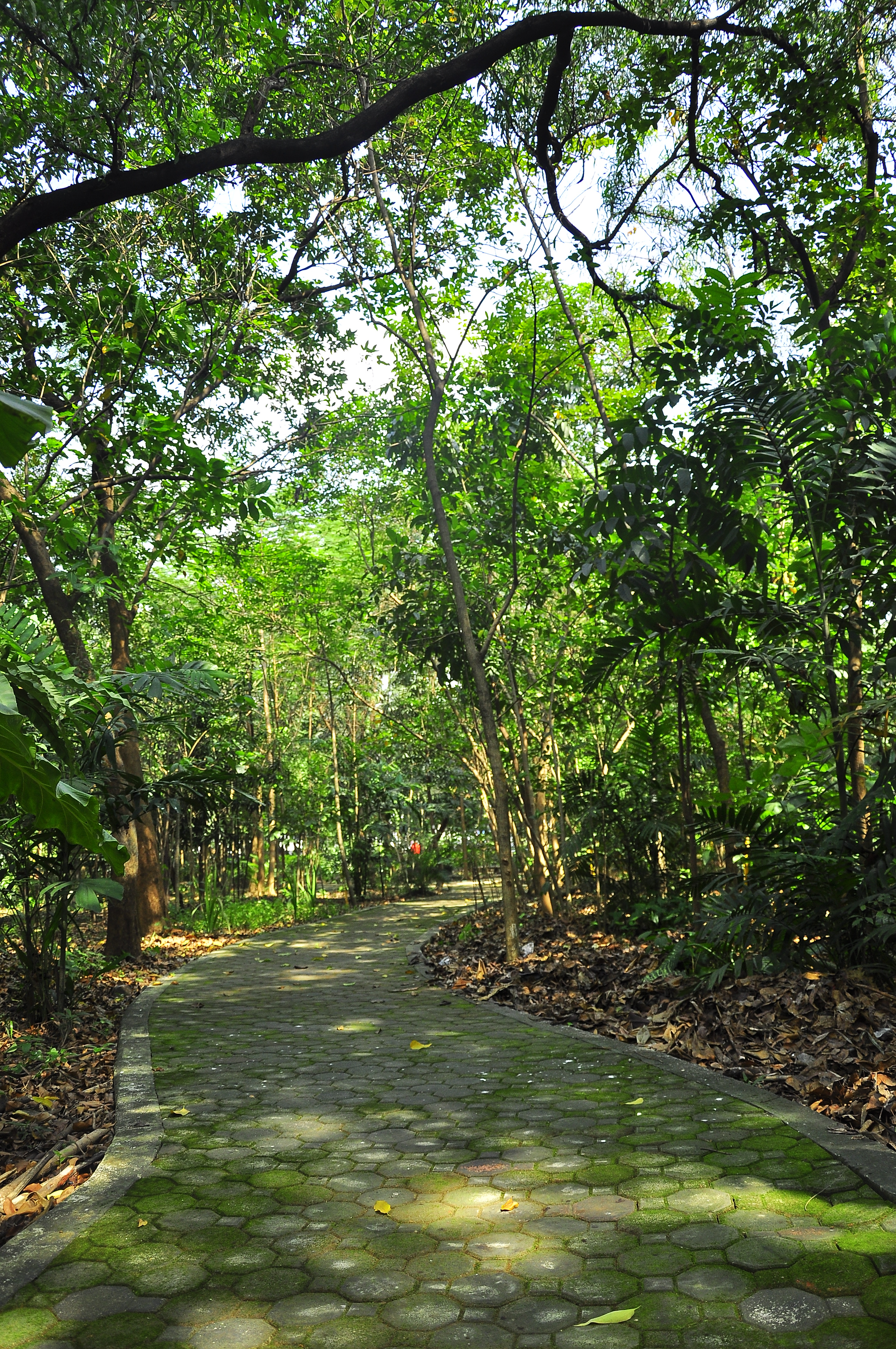
A trail inside the forest park prior to renovation.

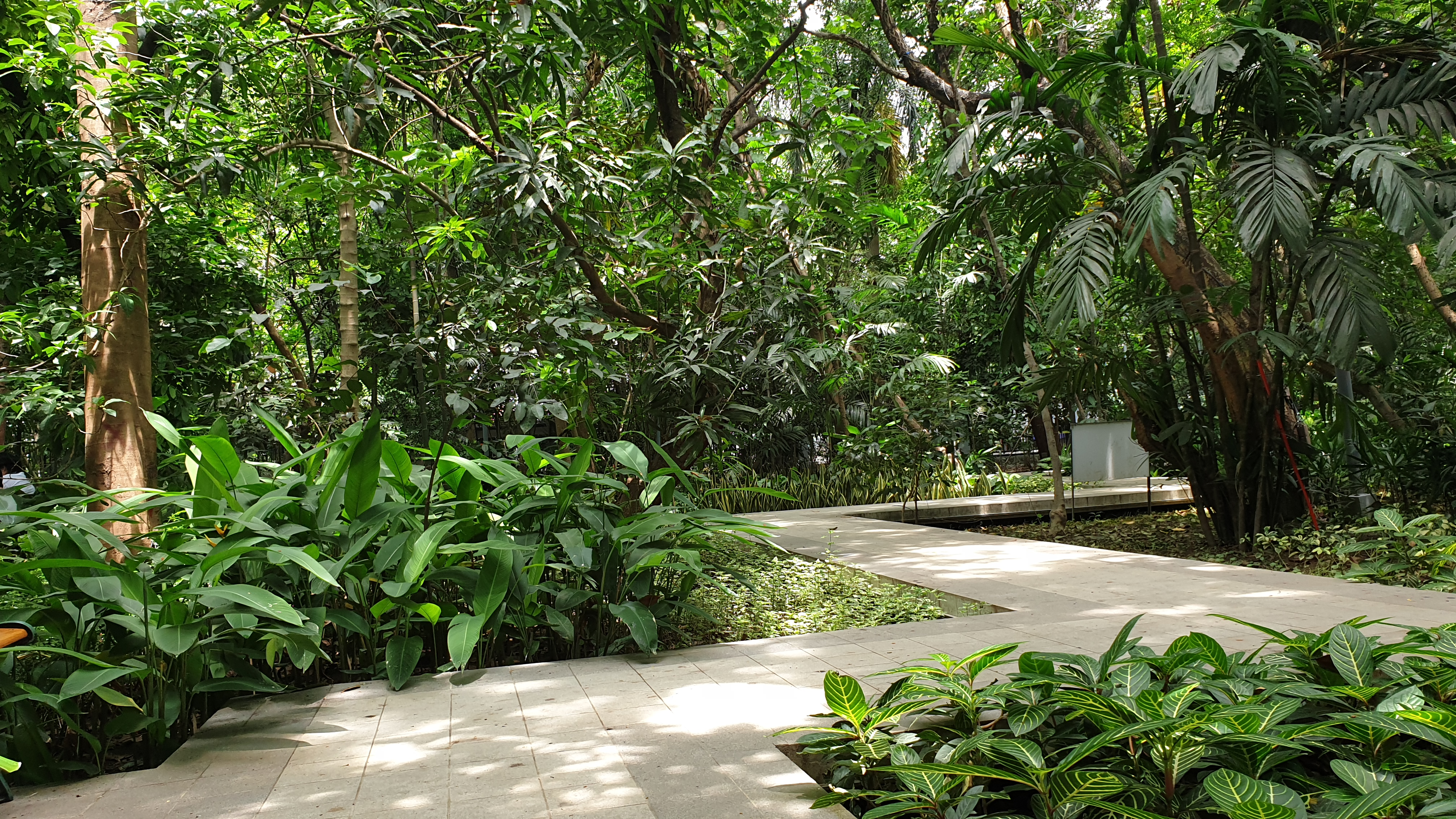
A winding, paved pathway inside the forest park after renovation.

The Arroceros Forest Park is a riverside urban forest park in Manila, Philippines, located on Antonio Villegas Street (former Calle Arroceros) in the central district of Ermita.

Developed in 1993, the 2.2-hectare (5.4-acre) park on the south bank of the Pasig River, at the foot of Quezon Bridge, consists of secondary growth forest with 61 tree varieties and 8,000 ornamental plants providing a habitat for 10 different bird species. Despite its small size, it is considered an important feature of the city in providing fresh air to the Lawton area, which is traversed by many commuters from other cities in the region. It lies in a historic area of Manila and has been called "Manila's last lung", being the city's only nature park. The park is administered by the City Government of Manila in partnership with private environmental group, Winner Foundation.

== History ==
During Spanish rule, the area occupied by the Arroceros Forest Park was a commercial center known as the Parián de Arroceros, which served as the market of Manila until it was burned down and moved to Plaza Lawton (now Liwasang Bonifacio).

The name of the parián and present-day Arroceros takes from the plural form of arrocero, derived from Spanish word for "rice farmers", suggesting that it was a place where rice was delivered via riverline routes, and eventually sold to consumers and retailers.

In the 19th century, it was the site of the Fabrica de Arroceros, a tobacco factory of the Spanish Compañía General de Tabacos de Filipinas.

During the Philippine Revolution and the First Philippine Republic, revolutionary forces had control over the area for some time as they surrounded Intramuros.

During American rule, it was used as a military garrison which housed the Signal Corps at the Cuartel de Infantería ("infantry barracks") and the Surgeon General's office at the Estado Mayor ("major estate").

After World War II and Philippine independence, the barracks were converted into the headquarters of the Department of Education.

The park was established in 1993 after the Department of Education offices were transferred to its present location in Pasig. Through a memorandum of agreement signed between the City of Manila under Manila mayor Alfredo Lim and the Winner Foundation supported by then First Lady Amelita Ramos, the city agreed to lease the site to the private environmental group for development as a nature park. With an initial 150 century-old trees that survived the war, the park now hosts over 3,000 trees through reforestation efforts spearheaded by the Manila Seedling Bank.

The park became the subject of controversy in 2003, when Lim's successor, Manila mayor Lito Atienza ordered its closure to give way to the construction of a school administration building and teachers' dormitory for Division of City Schools – Manila on a portion of the park despite protests from conservation groups. The groups claimed that of the 8,000 trees in the park in the year 2000, only 2,000 remained when the buildings were completed. The park was reopened in 2007.

However, the memorandum of agreement signed earlier in the 1990s had expired a year later in 2008, leaving the park vulnerable to any future threats to its existence. A few years later, the park was threatened once again, when in July 2017, the Winner Foundation received an order from the Manila city government to vacate the park so that the city could build a gymnasium inside. This prompted the Winner Foundation and its partner groups to launch a signature campaign opposing the construction of the gym. An online Change.org petition made by a partner group urging the Senate Committee on Climate Change to take action reached 115,000 signatures. The construction of the gym was eventually deferred by former Manila mayor Joseph Estrada.

Upon winning the 2019 mayoral election against Estrada, then-incoming Manila mayor Isko Moreno said he would not allow any construction in Arroceros Forest Park, vowing to block the impending construction of the gym made by the previous city administration.

On February 27, 2020, Mayor Moreno signed City Ordinance No. 8607, or the Arroceros Forest Park Ordinance, designating the Arroceros Forest Park as a permanent forest park instead of an ordinary city property. Under this ordinance, cutting of trees, dumping of waste, and excavation is prohibited within the area. Alongside the ordinance, the mayor also revealed plans to allocate ₱1 million for the park's operations, to appoint "peace officers" to help in taking care of the park, and to expand the forest park as the highlight of a future green city in the Lawton area.

The park was formally reopened in February 2022 as the Arroceros Urban Forest Park after a redevelopment. The park which was 2.51 hectares (25,100 m^{2}) was expanded by 5 hectares (50,000 m^{2}).

In October 2023, a group of public school teachers staged a "Zumba protest" at Arroceros Park in front of the DCS-Manila offices to demand higher wages, better facilities and working conditions, and a bigger budget for the education sector.

In November 2023, the Bawal Mag-Shoot Dito pro-photography advocacy group held a "Tigil Pitik Photowalk" lit. 'Stop Shooing Photowalk' at Arroceros Park in protest of rules across various public parks in the country that prohibited the taking of photos for personal and non-commercial use.

Amidst an El Niño phenomenon in April 2024, the park made headlines for having a recorded temperature of 36 °C (97 °F), which was 5 °C (9 °F) cooler than the recorded 41 °C (106 °F) temperature in the rest of Manila. The lower temperatures in the park have highlighted the park's role in combating the urban heat island effect in the city.

In October 2025, the Pasig River Esplanade Phase 4 section was opened to the public, connecting the Manila Central Post Office to Arroceros Park.

== Description ==
The Arroceros Forest Park, designed by landscape architect Wilfrido Dizon and the Bulacan Garden Corporation, is home to over 3,500 trees of diverse variety, such as acacia mangium, acacia auriculiformis, African tulip tree, agoho, anahaw, banyan, bunga de china, dapdap, eucalyptus, ficus benjamina, fire tree, Indian tree, kamagong, mahogany, MacArthur palm, molave, narra, neem, rain tree, rattan, rubber tree, talisay, teak, tiesa and yucca. It is also inhabited by different fruit trees, including aratilis, avocado, banana, caimito, coconut, guava, macopa, mango, santol, as well as ornamental plants like calachuchi, gardenia, golden shower, palomaria and ylang-ylang. The park has tiled pathways and concrete roads giving access to areas around the park. It also contains a fountain, fish pond and bridge, as well as a riverside walk, which in 2025, was renovated and integrated to the Pasig River Esplanade. The park is a habitat of different bird species, such as the long-tailed shrike, pied fantail, zebra dove, Pacific swallow, yellow-vented bulbul and brown shrike.

It also houses the Manila Education Center, the central offices for the Division of City Schools - Manila located at its southern edge.

== Accessibility ==
The park is located in the center of Manila, just north of the Manila City Hall adjacent to the walled district of Intramuros. It is within walking distance from the LRT Line 1 Central Terminal station and is right across from the Manila Metropolitan Theater. It is accessible from Rizal Park and southern Manila via Padre Burgos Avenue, and from northern Manila via Quezon Boulevard and Quezon Bridge. It is also near the Lawton Bus Terminal and the Pasig River Ferry Lawton Station.

== Gallery ==
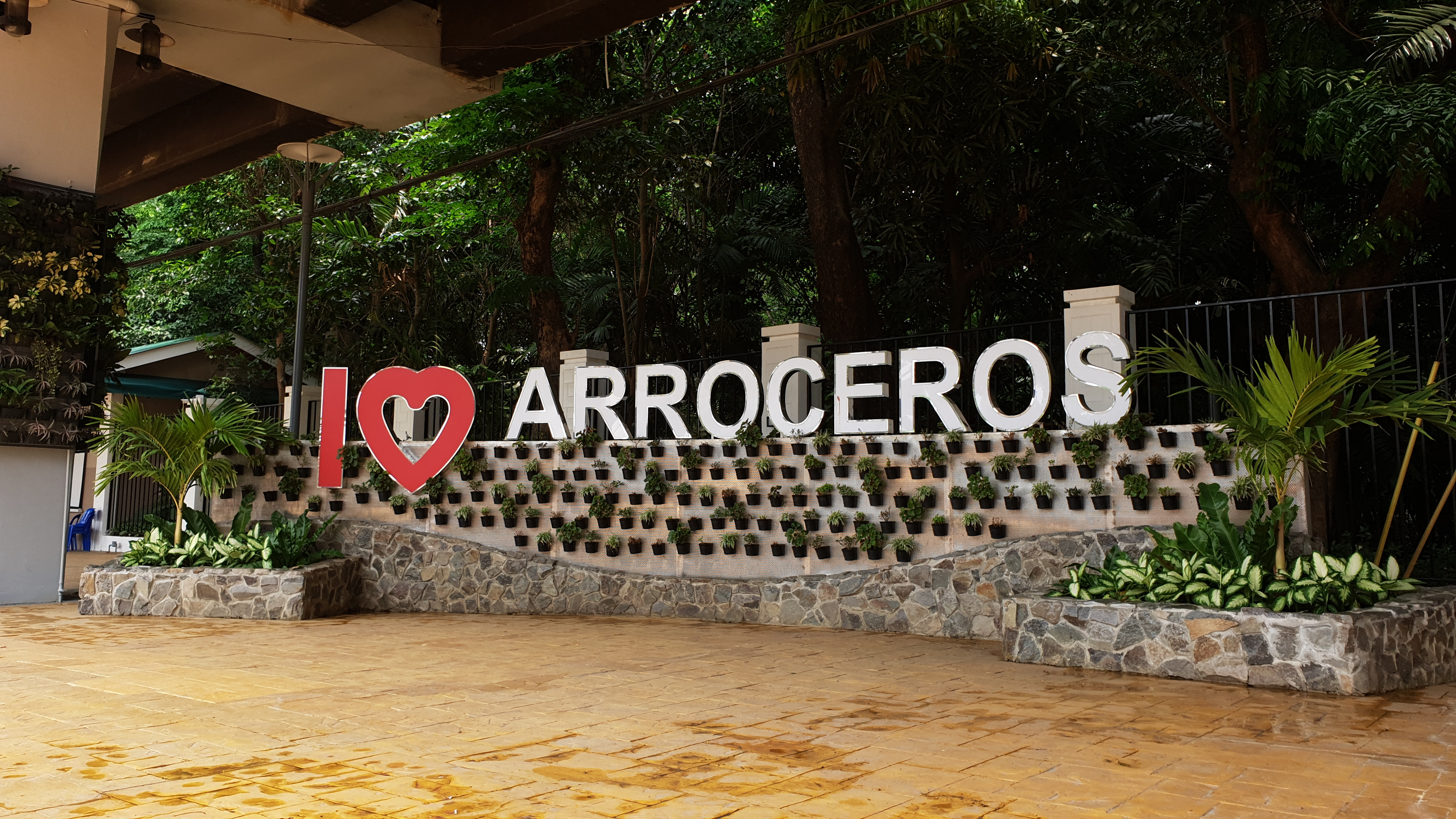
The welcome sign to the park at the pedestrianized plaza outside the park.

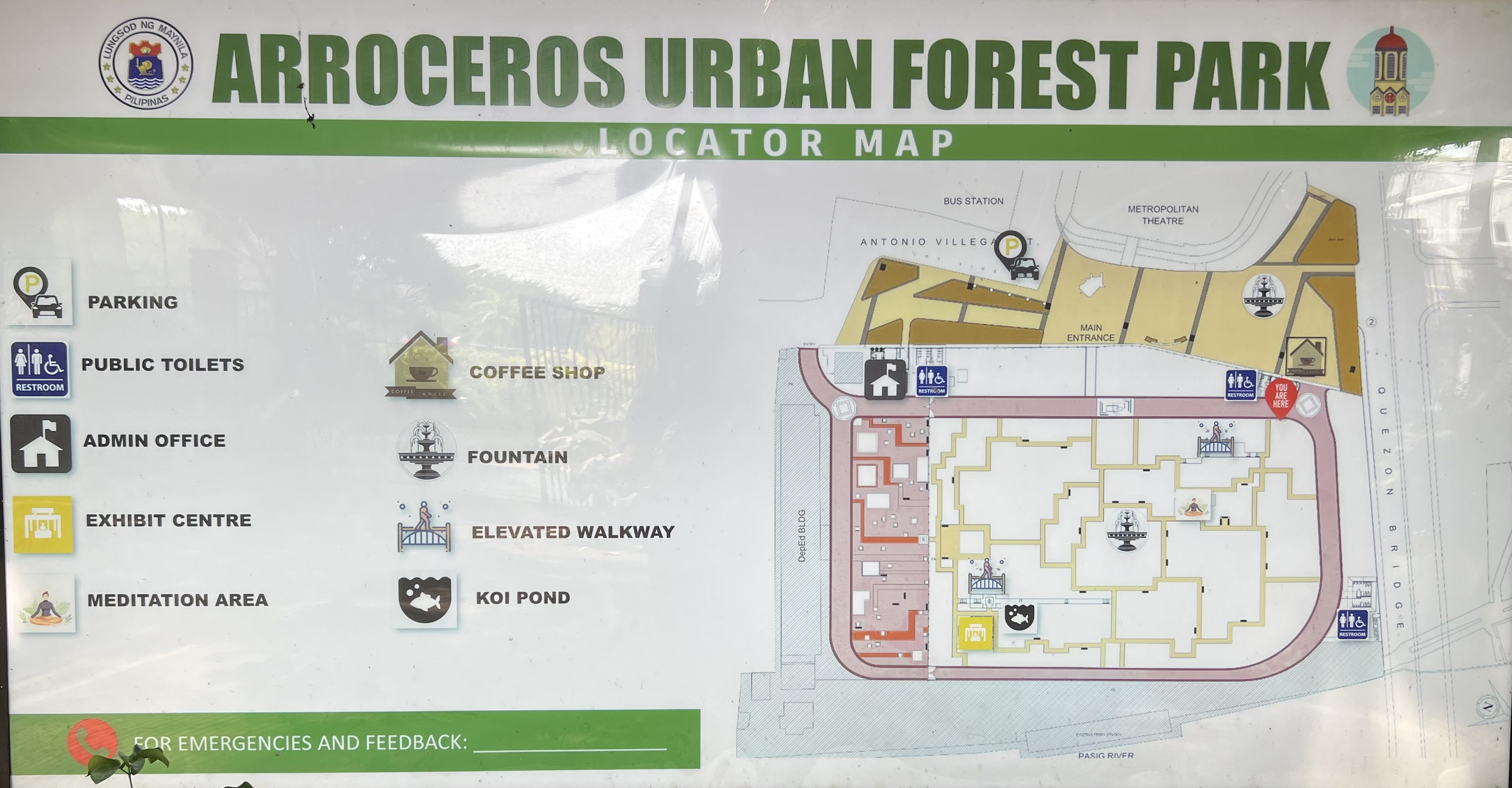
Locator map signage

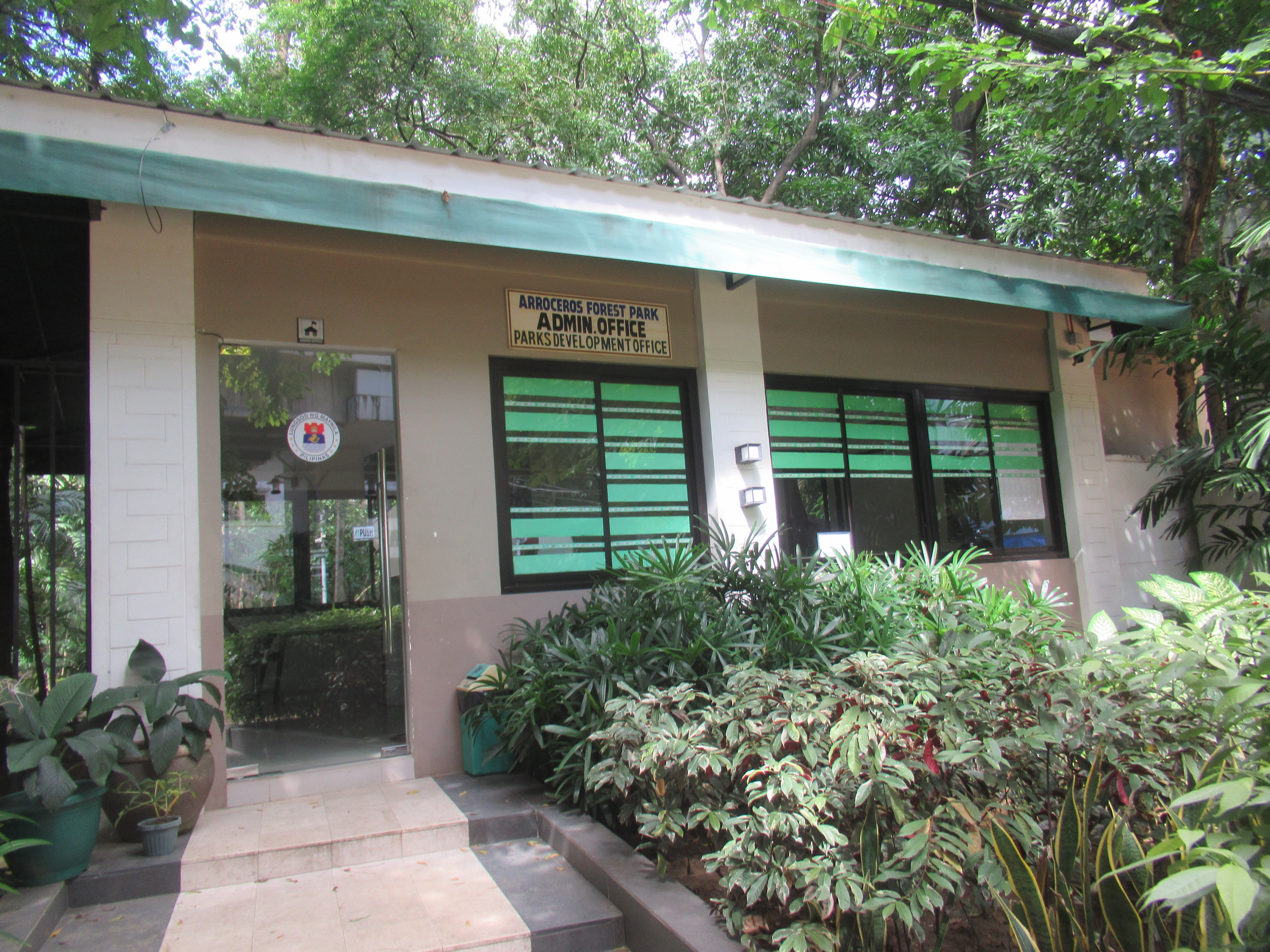
Admin office

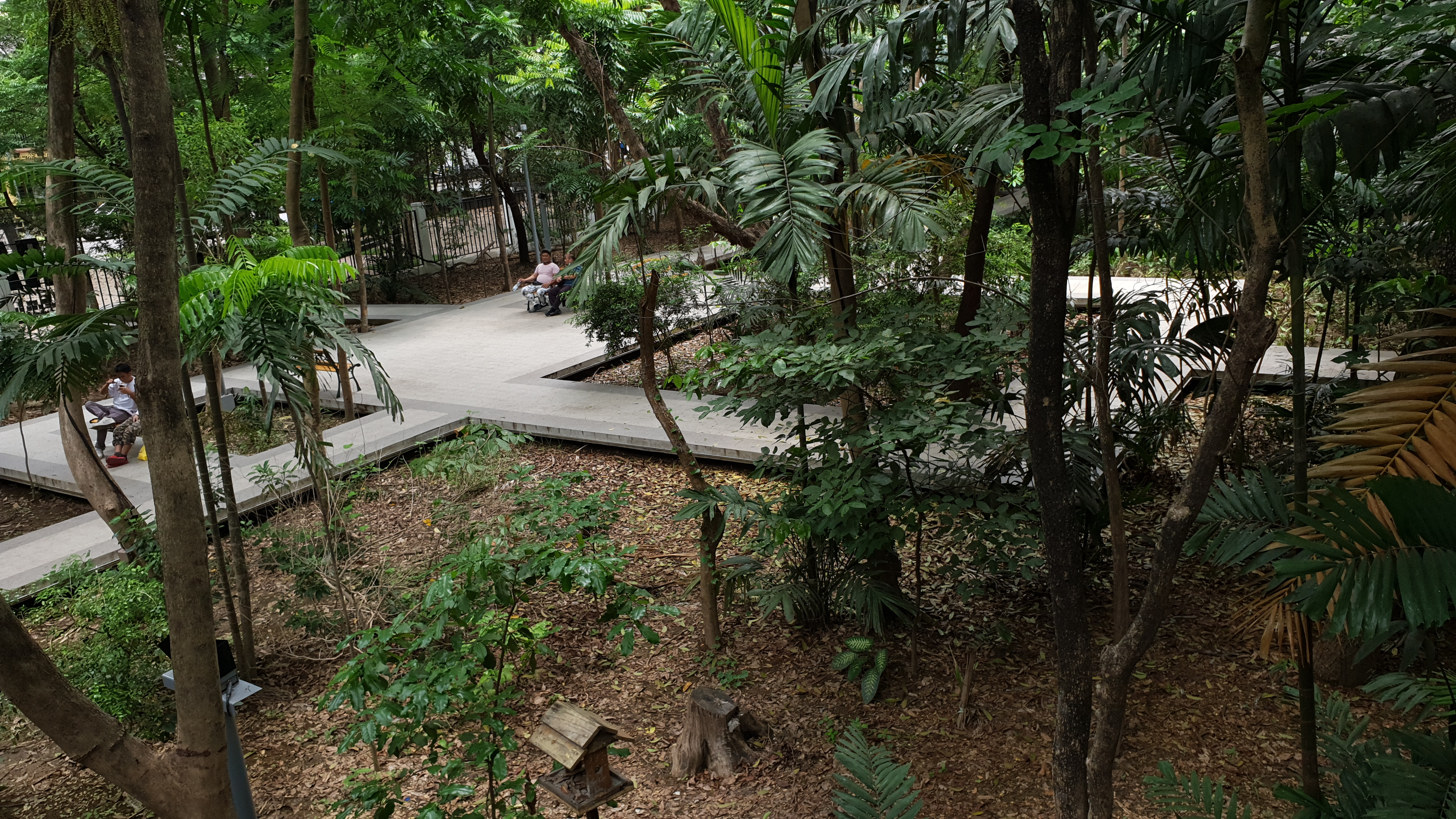
An overview of pathways inside the forest park.

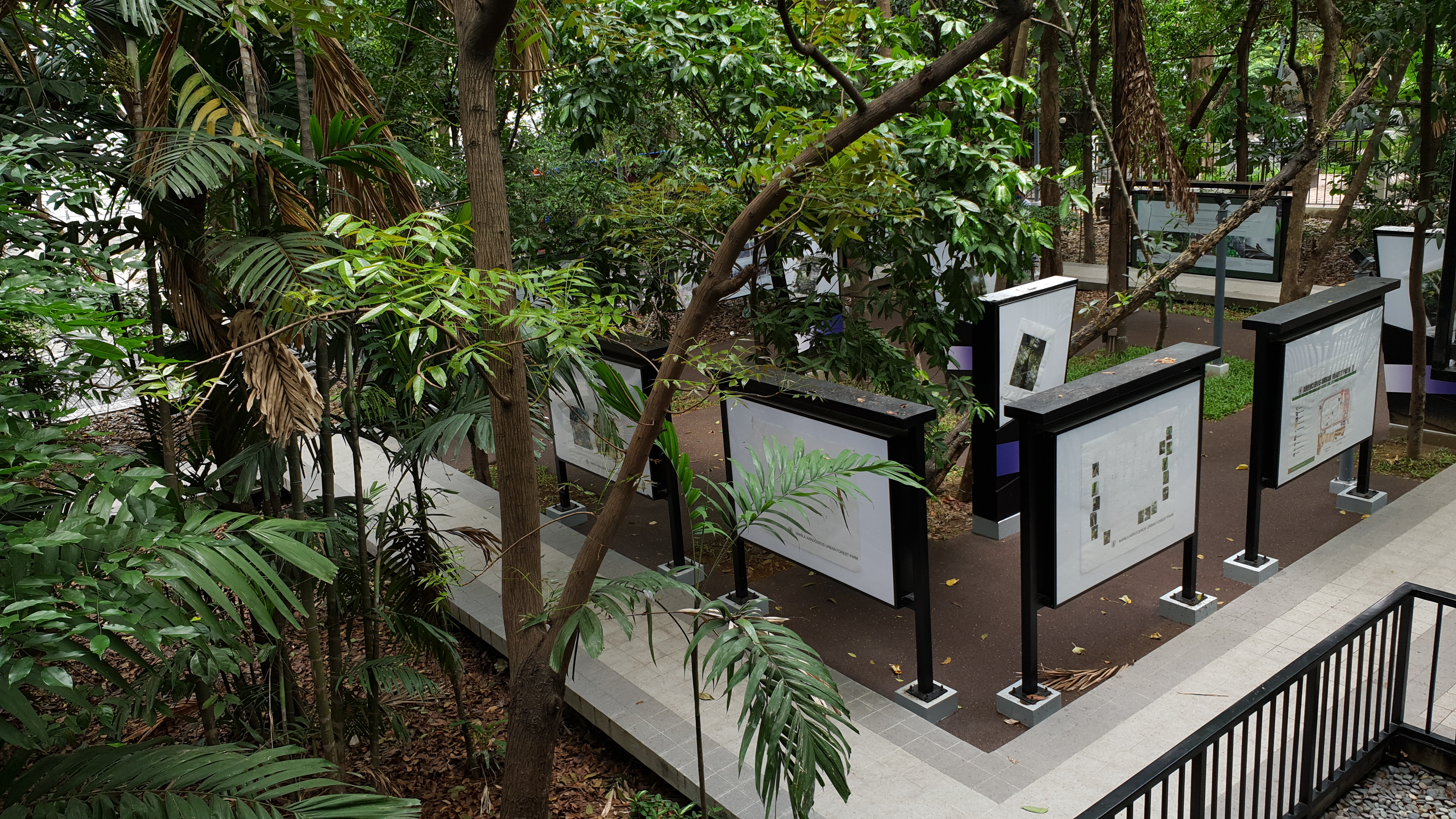
A series of exhibits on the fauna and flora in the forest park.

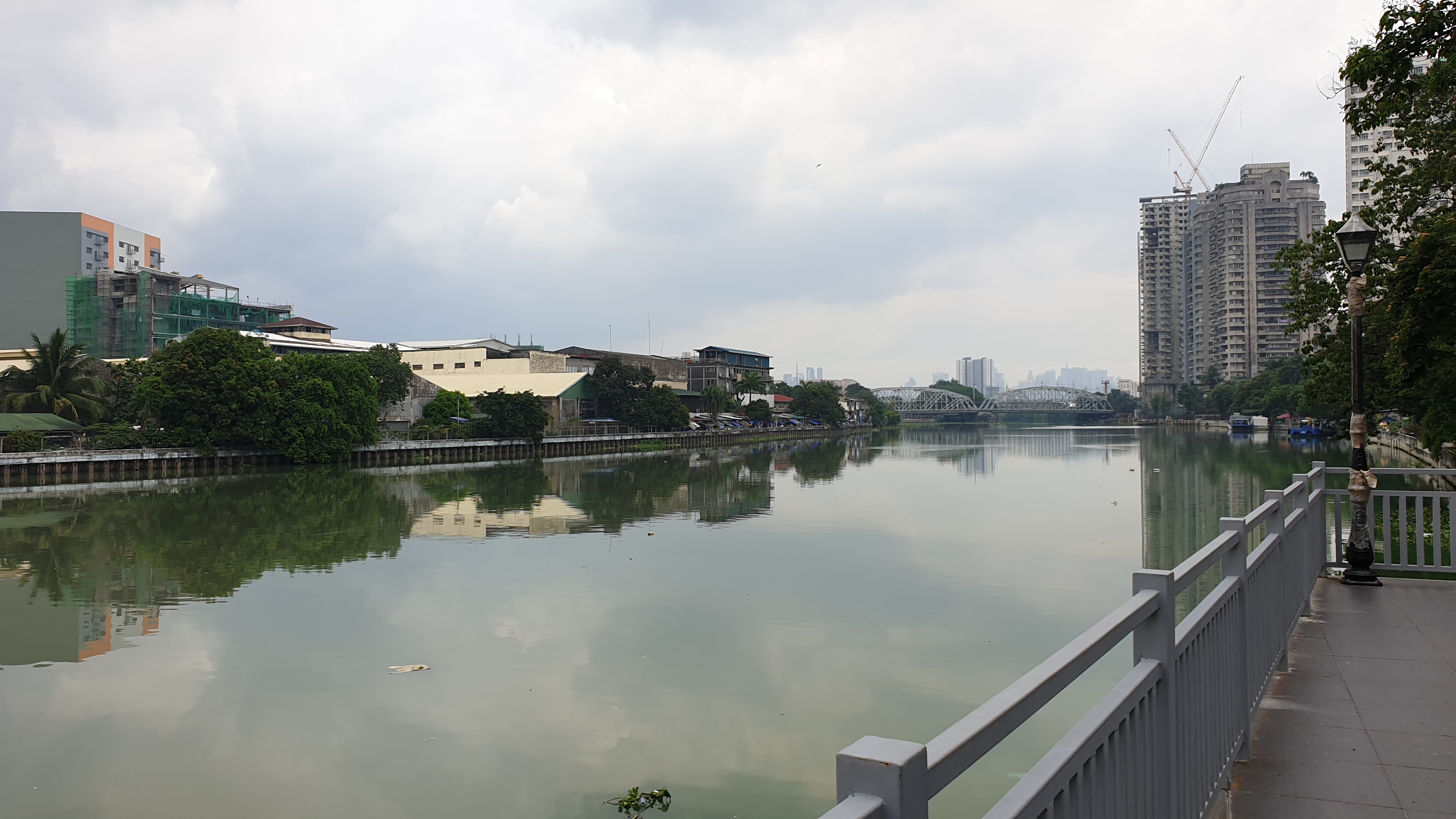
Old esplanade along the Pasig River behind the forest park in 2022.

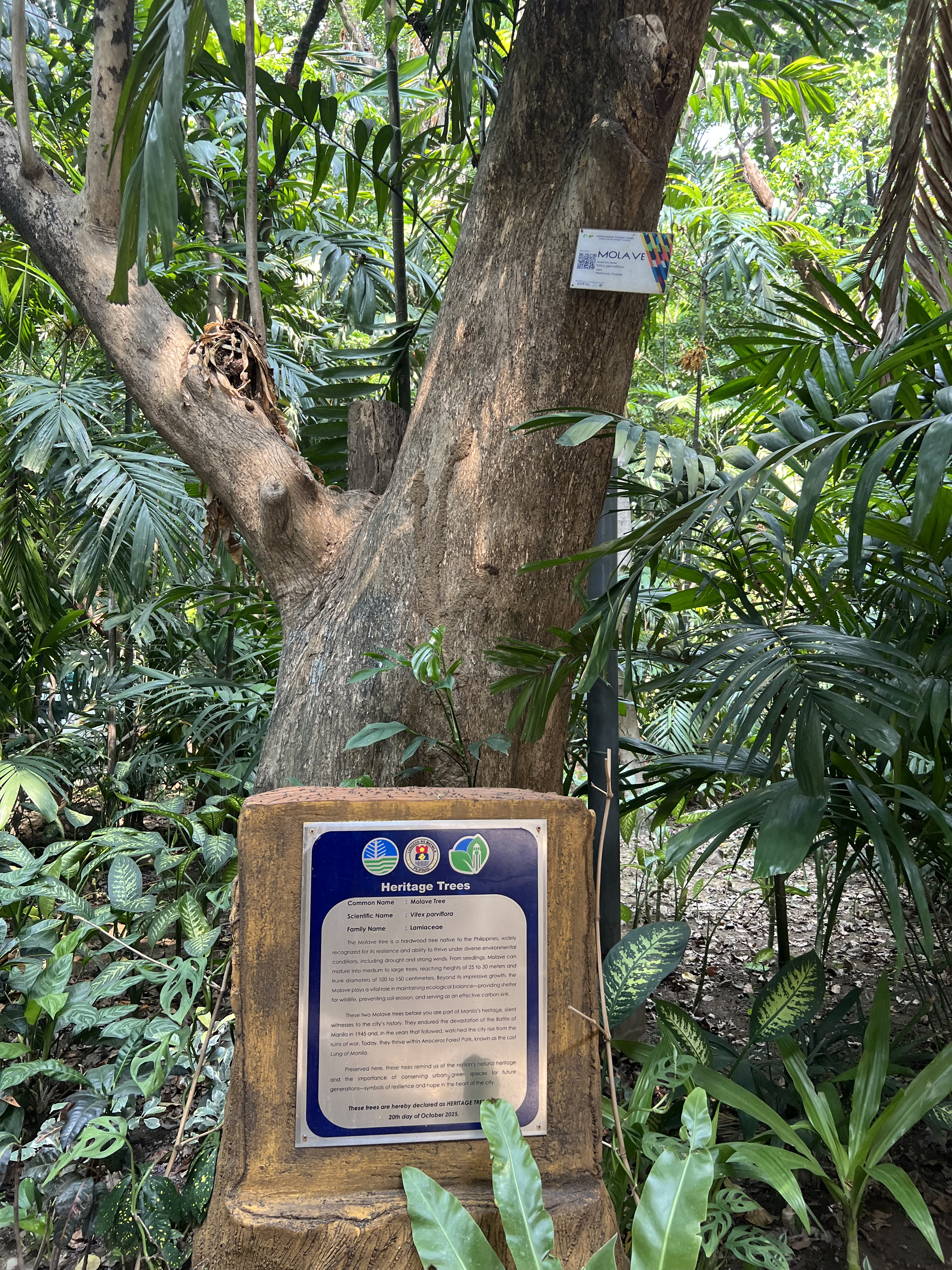
A Molave (Vitex parviflora) tree, declared as a heritage tree by the City Government of Manila in 2025

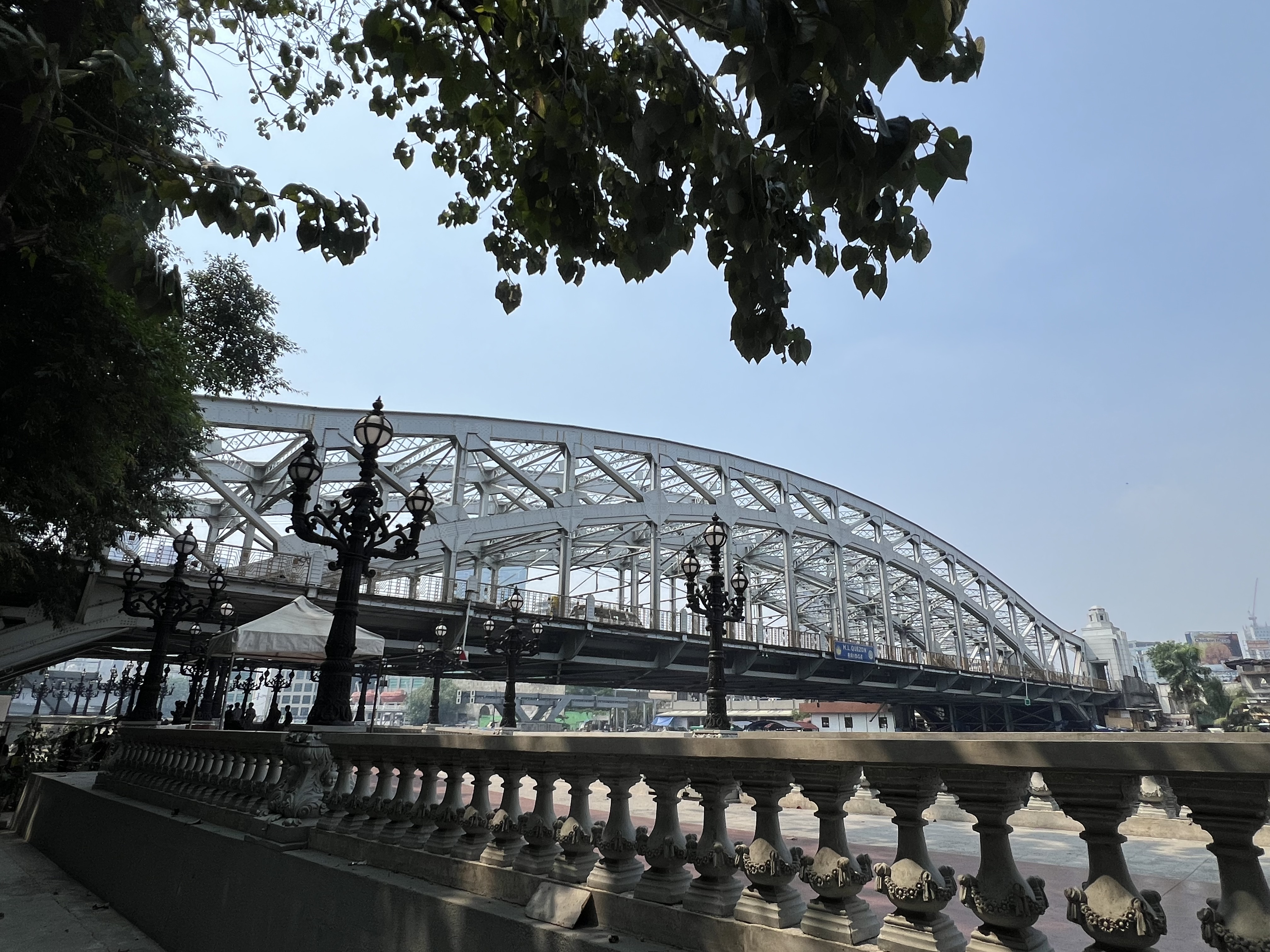
View of the Quezon Bridge from a section of the Pasig River Esplanade connected to the park
