= Manila Seedling Bank =

Environmental center in Quezon City, Philippines

- Manila Seedling Bank Foundation, Inc.
- Formation: 1977; 49 years ago
- Type: Nonprofit
- Products: Plants; Seeds
- Services: Reforestation aid and tree care services

The Manila Seedling Bank Foundation, Inc. (MSBFI) was a nonprofit organization in the Philippines. It maintained a plant nursery or environmental center in Quezon City until 2013. The foundation had a legal issue with the local government of Quezon City regarding the taxation of its environmental center, which resulted in its closing.

A land area of 7 hectares (0.027 sq mi) in the corners of EDSA and Quezon Avenue in Quezon City, owned by the National Housing Authority, was granted usufructuary rights for the MSBFI as an environmental center in 1977 for 50 years through a Presidential Proclamation. The area was declared tax-exempt, but new legislation in Quezon City eventually declared the MSBFI property subject to paying taxes. The Quezon City government auctioned the property but eventually forfeited it to the local government. In 2013 and 2014, the Quezon City local government occupied the property and displaced tenants for failure to pay taxes. A 2024 Supreme Court ruling declared that the Quezon City government "wrongfully foreclosed" the property and invalidated their takeover of the property on the basis that the Quezon City legislation is not superior to national legislation.

The environmental center was planned for development after the takeover. The Philippine Diamond Tower, a 612-meter (2,008 ft) observation tower, was planned to be constructed in the area, but was never done. The under-construction Quezon Avenue station of the Metro Manila Subway currently situates the Manila Seedling Bank environmental center.

== History ==
=== Foundation ===
The National Housing Authority (NHA) occupied the land area between EDSA, Quezon Avenue, and North Avenue in Quezon City. In 1968, 120 hectares of the area was provided to the National Government Center as a reserved property sight. However, in 1977, the Manila Seedling Bank Foundation, a nonprofit institution, was granted usufructuary rights of the seven-hectare property for 50 years through Presidential Proclamation 1670. A Presidential Decree in the same year declared MSBFI tax-exempt. The foundation used the property as an environmental center, which served as a plant nursery for the government’s reforestation projects, such as a reforestation program in the La Mesa Watershed Reservation from 1978 to 1983 and the Arroceros Urban Forest Park.

Tax exemption privileges of MBSFI were withdrawn in 1991 through the Local Government Code. The MSBFI's certificate of registration was revoked on February 21, 2002, for not providing financial statements from 1996 to 2003, which made MSBFI no longer have a legal personality with the Securities and Exchange Commission and was thus not a legal entity. A 2003 amendment of the Quezon City zoning ordinance reclassified the property into a Metropolitan Commercial Zone and an Institutional Zone.

An auction was held in December 2005, which was voided by the Quezon City Regional Trial Court in 2009. The foundation filed an appeal that went to the Supreme Court, which ruled in the city government’s favor in 2010 after it denied the petition for review filed by the MSBFI. The Supreme Court decision stated that although the compound was owned by NHA, the foundation was not exempted from paying taxes. The high court’s decision became final and executory on February 21, 2011. Another auction was held in July 2011; both auctions had no buyers, thus, the property was forfeited to the local government.

=== Quezon City property takeover ===
The Quezon City local government occupied the seven-hectare property on July 10, 2012, after a one-year redemption period for MSBFI to settle dues expired. The local government placed tarpaulins that state that the property was forfeited "in favor of the Quezon City government" and prohibited entry of private vehicles for failure to pay ₱57,208,000 in real estate taxes between 2001 and 2011. In the same year, the city refused to issue a locational clearance to MSBFI which resulted in its failure to renew its business permit due to the rezoning of the area.

The MSBFI filed graft charges against Quezon City mayor Herbert Bautista and 6 other city officials for the takeover of the local government on the seven-hectare property, as the foundation's management claimed that they were exempt from paying taxes. One of them was Quezon City treasurer Edgar Villanueva, who imposed real property taxes on the seven-hectare lot from May 2011 to July 2012 and ordered an auction on the property which resulted in the eviction of MSBF and around ₱783,000 worth of losses of tenants' income. He was charged with graft by the Ombudsman for unlawfully imposing real property taxes on the MSBFI from 2011 to 2012 in 2017. The Ombudsman already cleared all of the accused by 2016, except for Villanueva, who was sentenced to six to ten years of imprisonment and perpetually disqualified from holding any office position. He was acquitted of his charges in 2022 by the Supreme Court.

Operations in the area continued even after the local government's takeover. The tenants signed a deed of undertaking in August 2012 with city administrator Victor Endriga in which they agreed to voluntarily dismantle their structures and vacate the compound within six months. However, they did not vacate the area. The local government ordered MSBFI on September 11, 2013, to comply with the National Building Code after finding out that MSBFI was not issued a building permit since 1977.

On December 9, 2013, the Quezon City government shut down the seven-hectare compound and evicted 82 tenants and stall owners from the area for operating without permits. Several tenants were relocated to the Quezon Memorial Circle. Tarpaulins stating that tenants must relocate by December 31, 2013, were placed. The area was reopened for tenants to prepare stalls for demolition or relocation.

Members of the Philippine National Police and demolition teams demolished the garden stalls in the area on January 20, 2014. Tenants who refused to relocate were given until February 15. A protest in the MSBFI property was held on February 8.

In 2014, the Philippine Diamond Tower was planned to be built within the MSBFI property but was never built. The Department of Transportation and Communications proposed that the area be used for an integrated transport terminal, but Victor Endriga, senior adviser to Mayor Herbert Bautista, said that they were not keen on such a proposal as the Diamond Tower was already planned and the local government was looking for possible development of hotels, parks, and shopping malls.

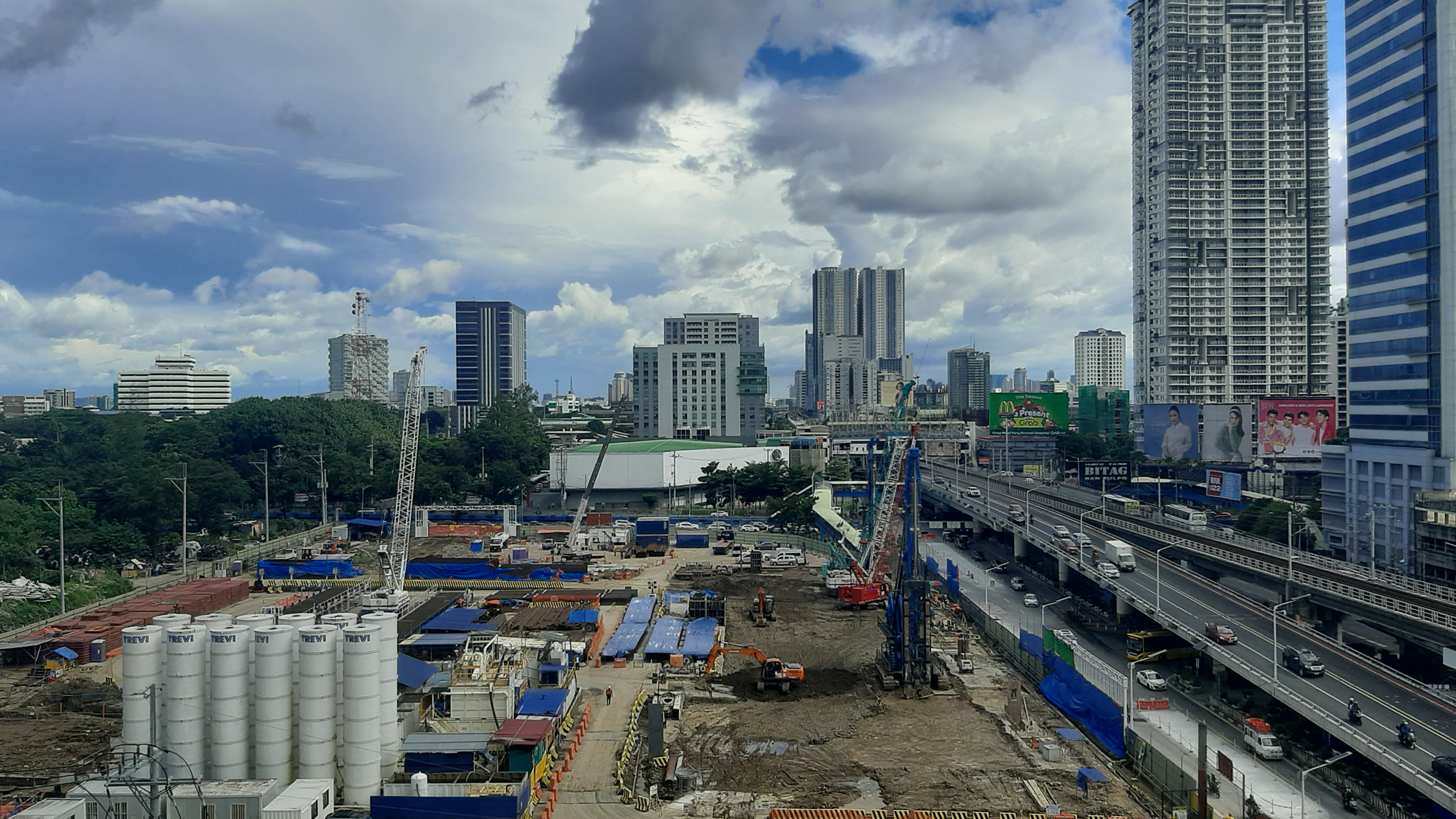
The corners of EDSA and Quezon Avenue in 2024. The Quezon Avenue station of the Metro Manila Subway is in the seven-hectare property of MSBFI.

The area by 2022 is now serving as the construction area for the Quezon Avenue station of the Metro Manila Subway.

=== 2024 Supreme Court Ruling ===
A Supreme Court press release on August 8, 2024, invalidated the amendment of the Quezon City Zoning Ordinance passed in 2003 and ruled that the local government wrongfully enclosed the environmental center of MSBFI. In the decision penned by Associate Justice Ramon Paul Hernando, the Supreme Court held that the city's legislations are subordinated to national legislation, and thus lacked the authority to reclassify the property for a use different from that originally intended by Proclamation No. 1670. The Quezon City local government acknowledged the decision. The MSBFI announced plans to take over the seven-hectare property September 1.

== Facilities ==
Manila Seedling Bank Environmental Center
- Type: Plant nursery
- Location: Triangle Park, Quezon City
- Coordinates: 14°38′44.3″N 121°02′15.7″E
- Area: 7 hectares (0.027 sq mi)
- Established: 1977
- Closed: 2013
- Owner: Manila Seedling Bank Foundation, Inc.

The Manila Seedling Bank Foundation, Inc. had a seven-hectare property in Quezon City that was used as a plant nursery for reforestation projects and a plant and seed selling area for researchers and gardeners. Several greenhouses and tiangge were also present in the property. Aside from seeds and plants, MSBFI also provided reforestation, pet care, and tree care services. The environmental center had entry gates in Agham Road (now Senator Miriam P. Defensor-Santiago Avenue) and Quezon Avenue. The property also housed a chapel, a bonsai nursery, and an administration building.
