= January 2025 Iglesia ni Cristo protests =

2025 anti-impeachment rally across the Philippines

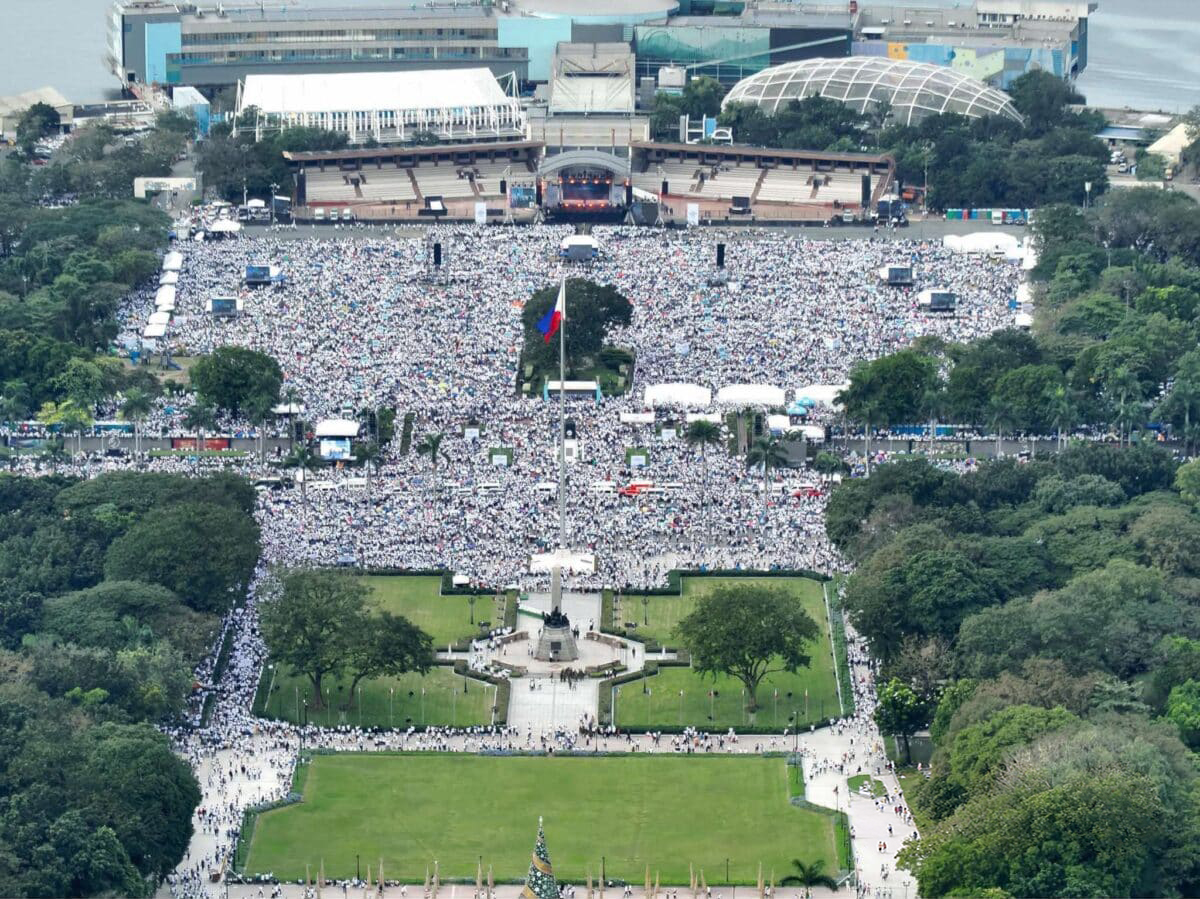
- Attendees of the main rally at the Quirino Grandstand
- Date: January 13, 2025
- Location: Philippines, primarily in Manila
- Type: Mass demonstration
- Theme: "National Rally for Peace"
- Cause: President Bongbong Marcos's statement to Congress to desist from starting impeachment efforts against Vice President Sara Duterte
- Organized by: Iglesia ni Cristo
- Participants: 1.8 million protesters 1.58 million in Manila

The National Rally for Peace (Filipino: Pagtitipon Para sa Kapayapaan at Pagkakaisa, lit. 'Meeting for Peace and Unity') was a series of demonstrations organized by the Iglesia ni Cristo on January 13, 2025, in support of President Bongbong Marcos's statement opposing the impeachment efforts against Vice President Sara Duterte.

== Background ==
In the 2022 Philippine election, Bongbong Marcos and Sara Duterte were elected president and vice president of the Philippines, respectively. Both are part of the UniTeam electoral alliance. They assumed their respective offices on June 30, 2022.

However, relations between the two deteriorated by mid-2024. Duterte tendered resignation from her position as education secretary in June 2024. When asked about her friendship with Marcos in September 2024, she said they were never friends and merely running mates in the 2022 elections. Marcos responded expressing he was "deceived" about their supposed friendship. In October 2024, she detailed her fallout with Marcos, who she says "does not know how to be president".

Despite the rift on November 29, 2024, President Marcos confirmed that he had directed the House of Representatives to refrain from filing an impeachment motion against Sara Duterte. This is despite his rift with Vice President Sara Duterte which he described as "a storm in a teacup" and maintained that any potential effort to impeach his deputy would be a waste of time that it "does not make a difference to even one single Filipino life.".

In December 2024, at least three complaints were filed in the Congress seeking the impeachment Sara Duterte from the vice presidency. The first of which was filed on December 2.

The Iglesia ni Cristo on December 4 announced that it plans to hold a rally to oppose the impeachment efforts concurring with President Marcos' stance in November 2024 that efforts to remove Duterte from office are unconstructive.

Sara Duterte came off from a trip from Japan arriving morning in Manila on January 13, 2025.

The INC has a membership of 2.8 million people and is known for engaging in bloc voting. The church endorsed Marcos and Duterte in the 2022 Philippine presidential election.

== Preparations ==
=== Organizers ===
The Iglesia ni Cristo (INC) announced their plan to hold a rally as early as December 4, 2024. It was made known through Net 25's Sa Ganang Mamamayan hosted by Gen Subardiaga The INC initially inquired the National Parks Development Committee (NDPC) on December 23, 2024, if the Quirino Grandstand at the Rizal Park in Manila would be available for their main rally on January 13, 2025. The request was initially denied since it would conflict with the Pentecostal Missionary Church of Christ's crusade on January 19. The Pentecostal event attendees though were expected to ingress as early as January 13.

The rally venue was moved to the Liwasang Bonifacio, a freedom park – therefore no permission is needed for the demonstration. The church wrote to Manila mayor Honey Lacuna to inform her of their plan. Lacuna's office met with INC officials on January 6, suggesting the INC to move their venue back to the Quirino Grandstand due to the expected large crowd for the INC event. The INC met with the Pentecostal Church the following day, with the latter agreeing to move the ingress to January 14. The NPDC eventually approved INC's request to use the Quirino Grandstand.

INC members were asked to wear white while supporters of Duterte were told to wear green and black.

=== Government ===
While there is no legal prohibition on premature campaigning, the Commission on Elections (COMELEC) has dissuaded candidates for the 2025 Philippine general election from taking part in the demonstrations. It, however, says it will not monitor the event out of respect for its "religious nature".

The Philippine National Police (PNP) deployed 8,000 personnel nationwide for the event with 5,500 of them stationed near the Quirino Grandstand in Manila. They reuse the comprehensive security plan they used for the 2025 run of the translacion for the Feast of the Black Nazarene. It cooperated with the Metropolitan Manila Development Authority to manage the flow of traffic during the gathering. Temporary road closures were enforced.

Executive Secretary Lucas Bersamin ordered government agencies not to impair the conduct of the rally. Government work and classes were suspended in some of the cities where rallies are scheduled to be held. The national government specifically suspended work and classes in Manila and Pasay.

== Demonstration ==
The Iglesia ni Cristo dubs the January 13, 2025 demonstrations as the "National Rally for Peace". The rally is widely seen as the INC backing the stance of President Bongbong Marcos' stance of being against the pursuing of impeachment proceedings against Vice President Sara Duterte despite their rift. According to INC spokesperson Edwil Zabala, the church prefers not to characterize the gathering as "political" but rather "moral". He insists the church has not invited specific people and did not invite any politicians who did attend on stage

The INC denied characterization that the rally was a show of force to dissuade members of Congress to support the impeachment proceedings but merely to support President Marcos' statement that the country has more pressing issues than Duterte's potential removal from office. Church leaders made references to the impeachment complaints during rallies.

=== Summary of locations ===
National Rally for Peace venues.

The National Rally for Peace was primarily held at the Quirino Grandstand in Manila on January 13, 2025. Other cities or municipalities served as secondary venues.

Luzon

- Legazpi, Albay – Sawangan Park
- Ilagan, Isabela – Ilagan Sports Complex
- Bantay, Ilocos Sur – Quirino Stadium
- Puerto Princesa – Palawan Provincial Capitol compound

Visayas

- Cebu City – South Road Properties (SRP) grounds
- Iloilo City – Freedom Grandstand
- Bacolod – Provincial Capitol Park and Lagoon
- Ormoc – Ormoc City Plaza

Mindanao

- Davao City – San Pedro Square
- Pagadian, Zamboanga del Sur
- Butuan – Butuan Sport Complex
- Cagayan de Oro – Plaza Divisoria

=== Metro Manila ===
Attendees arrived as early as a day before the January 13, 2025 demonstrations. The Philippine National Police (PNP) estimates around 1.5 million attendees are at the Quirino Grandstand for the National Rally for Peace by 10:00 am. They came to Metro Manila from nearby provinces such as Cavite, Nueva Ecija, Quezon, Tarlac and Zambales. Traffic was at standstill with nearby roads serving as parking lots for 15,000 vehicles carrying attendees.

=== Other locations ===
In Davao City, the rally was held at the San Pedro Square. Around 250,000 to 300,000 took part in the demonstrations in Davao City. The Protect VP Sara Movement was among the groups which took part in the Davao gathering.

The South Road Properties (SRP) grounds in Cebu City had at least 45,000 people by 11:00 am.

In Bacolod, the city police estimates 70,000 attended. Nicolas Aca launched his own counter-protest dressing up in black and red with chains. Aca explained that his performance was a commentary on how religion is used to compel the faithful to follow their leaders. He was swiftly detained by the police. He was freed after the police failed to cite a law violation.

== Notable attendees ==
=== Quirino Grandstand, Manila ===
Senators

- Bong Go
- Ronald dela Rosa
- Robin Padilla
- Francis Tolentino

House of Representative members

- Rodante Marcoleta, SAGIP Partylist, senatorial aspirant

Senatorial aspirants

- Greco Belgica (PDP), former chairman of the Presidential Anti-Corruption Commission
- Jimmy Bondoc (PDP), singer, lawyer
- Phillip Salvador (PDP), actor

Governors

- Susan Yap, Governor of Tarlac

Mayors

- Honey Lacuna, incumbent Mayor of Manila
- Isko Moreno, former Mayor of Manila

Actors

- Vivian Velez, Partido Demokratiko Pilipino member

=== San Pedro Square, Davao City ===
Politicians

- Karlo Nograles, mayoral aspirant, former representative of Davao City's 1st district

== Reactions ==
=== Individual politicians ===
==== Executive branch ====
Executive Secretary Lucas Bersamin says that the conduct of the rally is evidence that peaceful assembly – the "bedrock right" guaranteed by the Constitution has been consistently upheld by the current administration of president Bongbong Marcos. He hoped that the gathering will lead to "clarify issues" which will lead to "true unity" for the nation.

Vice President Sara Duterte released a video thanking the INC for the rally.

==== Members of Congress ====
Senate President Chiz Escudero said the premise proposed by the rally of "peace and unity" for the Philippines is "non-debatable". He said he would want to attend the rally but disclosed he was approached by the INC for a short video statement. Senator Francis Tolentino backed the event believing the rally embodied the "shared desire of Filipinos for understanding and cooperation, transcending divisions for the common good" Senator Bong Go also expressed support while Senator Imee Marcos said that the rally is not affront to the separation between church and state and such is encouraged by free speech enshrined in the constitution. Robin Padilla who attended the rally in person vowed to vote against impeachment of Sara Duterte once the process reached the Senate.

ACT Teachers House of Representatives member France Castro denounced the rally as a "clear attempt" to protect Duterte from accountability over corruption allegations concerning the questionable use of the Office of the Vice President's usage of confidential funds. Colleague and INC member Rodante Marcoleta of the SAGIP Partylist denounce Castro's statement insisting that the INC has nothing to gain in "cuddling" anyone including Duterte and that the Makabayan bloc should have brought its grievance to the court system rather than through House inquiries.

==== Former officials ====
Former senator Leila de Lima believes that the rally is unlikely to stop the impeachment process and points out an SWS survey where 41% supported the removal of Duterte from office. However, she acknowledged that the demonstration might influence members of Congress especially those seeking reelection for the 2025 Philippine general election.

=== Organizations ===
The Kingdom of Jesus Christ of pastor Apollo Quiboloy issued a statement that its in solidarity with the INC's rally. It claims that 300,000 to 500,000 of its members would be attending the demonstrations in Davao City.

Bagong Alyansang Makabayan chairman Teodoro Casiño admitted that the rally could have made politicians reconsider their stance on efforts to impeach Duterte. He noted that it was not the first time a rally was held to discourage the impeachment of a politician and cited the impeachment case of then president Joseph Estrada.

== See also ==
- 2025 Philippine protests
- EDSA III
