= 2025 Philippine protests =

2025 Philippine protests may refer to:

== Relating to the Dutertes ==
- 2025 demonstrations in support of Rodrigo Duterte
  - January 2025 Iglesia ni Cristo protests

== Relating to the flood control scandal ==
- 2025–2026 Philippine anti-corruption protests
  - November 2025 Iglesia ni Cristo protests
