= MacArthur Bridge (Manila) =

Road bridge in Manila, Philippines

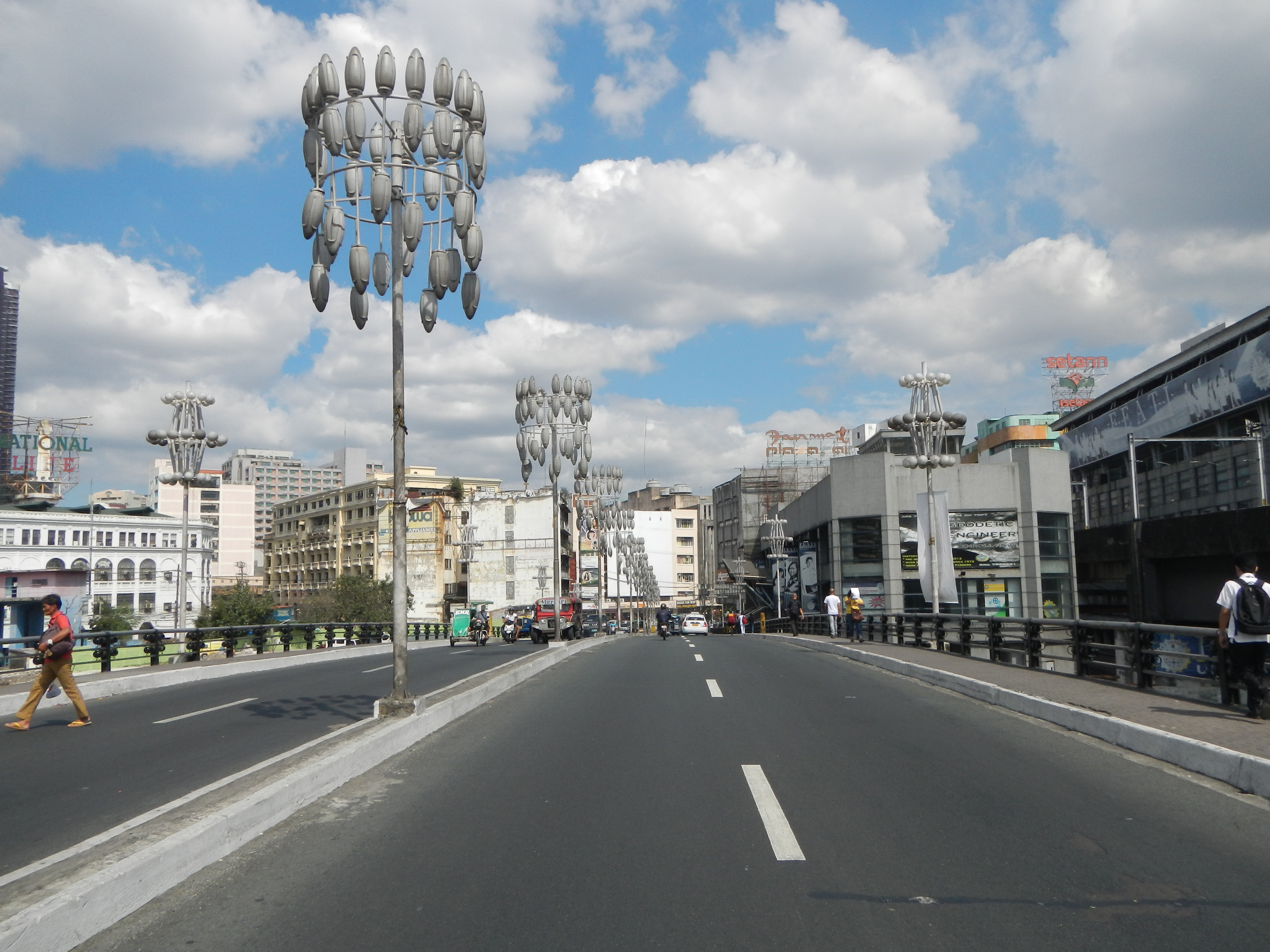
- MacArthur Bridge towards Santa Cruz, Manila
- Coordinates: 14°35′48.5″N 120°58′49.5″E
- Carries: Four lanes of N150, pedestrians and vehicles
- Crosses: Pasig River
- Locale: Manila, Philippines
- Named for: Douglas MacArthur
- Maintained by: Department of Public Works and Highways – North Manila District Engineering Office
- Preceded by: Jones Bridge
- Followed by: Quezon Bridge

Characteristics
- Design: Beam bridge
- Material: Reinforced concrete
- Total length: 116 m (381 ft)
- Width: 17.85 m (58.6 ft)
- Traversable?: Yes
- No. of spans: 3
- Piers in water: 2
- Load limit: 20 t (20,000 kg)
- No. of lanes: 4 (2 per direction)

History
- Inaugurated: 1952
- Replaces: Santa Cruz Bridge

Location
- Interactive map of MacArthur Bridge

The MacArthur Bridge is a road bridge crossing the Pasig River between Padre Burgos Avenue in Ermita and the intersection of Plaza Santa Cruz Road, Carriedo Street, Palanca Street, and Escolta Street in Santa Cruz. It replaced the Santa Cruz Bridge that was destroyed during World War II. The bridge is named after General Douglas MacArthur, whose military operations led to the liberation of the Philippines during World War II.

== History ==
The MacArthur Bridge replaced the older Santa Cruz Bridge, which was bombed when the Japanese retreated during the Battle of Manila. The bridge was constructed after the war and opened in 1952.

== Use on the procession of the Black Nazarene ==
The bridge was originally part of the procession route during the Feast of the Black Nazarene every January 9 from 2007 to 2013. However, after the Department of Public Works and Highways declared the bridge unstable and deemed it insufficient to carry millions of devotees, the processions were rerouted to the adjacent Jones Bridge.

== Douglas MacArthur monument ==
A monument to Douglas MacArthur stood at the foot of the south end of the bridge. The monument first stood on the façade of Pamantasan ng Lungsod ng Maynila before it was moved into its present location after 1997.

== See also ==
- List of crossings of the Pasig River
- List of places named for Douglas MacArthur
