= Santa Cruz Bridge =

Former bridge in Manila, Philippines

Santa Cruz Bridge Tulay ng Santa Cruz
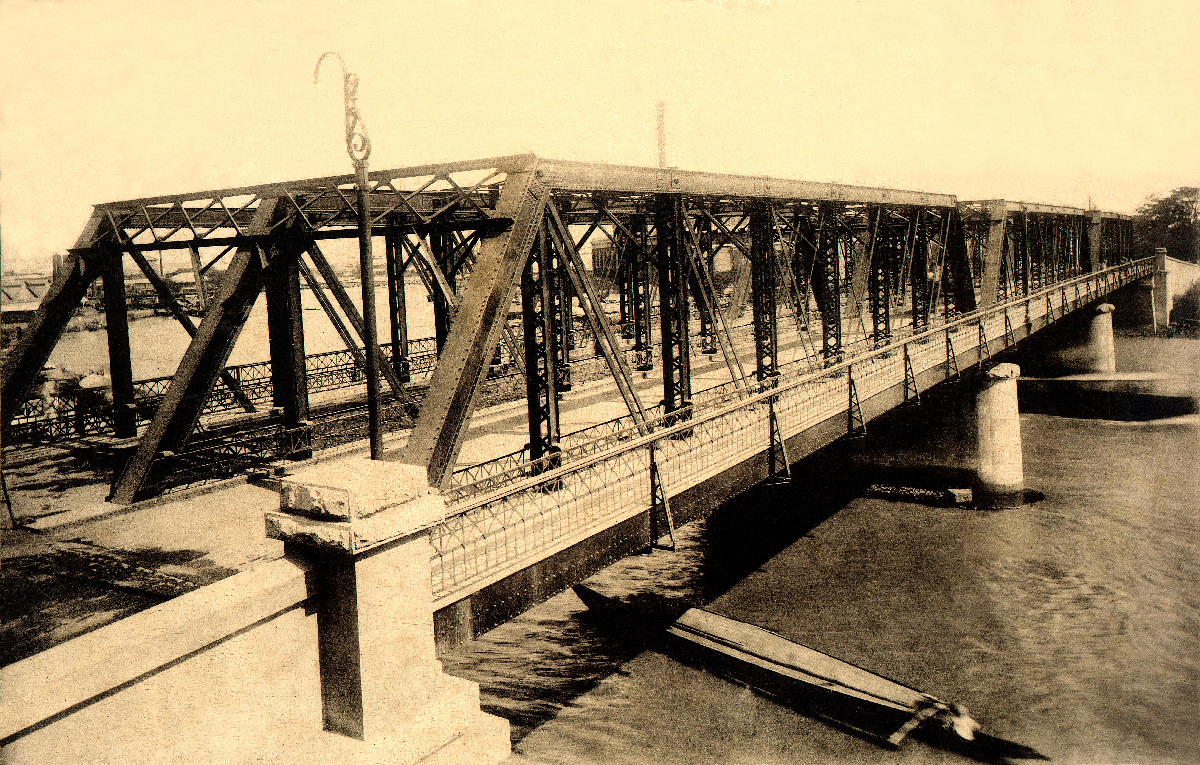
- The Santa Cruz Bridge in either 1896 or 1900.
- Coordinates: 14°35′48.5″N 120°58′49.5″E
- Carried: Vehicular traffic and pedestrians
- Crossed: Pasig River
- Locale: Santa Cruz District to the center of Manila
- Owner: City of Manila
- Preceded by: Puente Colgante (1902–1930s); Quezon Bridge (1930s–1945)
- Followed by: Bridge of Spain (1902–1914); Jones Bridge (I) (1916–1945)

History
- Construction start: 1900
- Construction end: 1902
- Construction cost: $184,769.10
- Opened: March 1, 1902
- Collapsed: 1945

The Santa Cruz Bridge was a bridge that spanned the Pasig River in the city of Manila in the Philippines. The steel truss bridge was the fourth to span the river connecting the district of Santa Cruz from Plaza Goiti to Arroceros Street in the old city center of Manila. The construction of the bridge was started by the Spanish colonial government in Manila but completed by the Americans after gaining sovereignty of the country from Spain after the Spanish–American War. The bridge was opened on March 1, 1902, but was destroyed in World War II during the liberation of Manila. A simpler reinforced concrete beam bridge was constructed after the war and the span was renamed as the MacArthur Bridge after General Douglas MacArthur.

== History ==
=== Spanish colonial period ===
During the last few years of the Spanish government in the islands, a bridge was in the project to span across the Pasig from the district of Santa Cruz at Plaza Goiti (now Plaza Lacson) to the south bank of the river connecting to Calle Arroceros (now Padre Burgos St.). The foundations were put down and the piers, two in number, and abutments were built to low-water mark, when the work ceased due to the growing instability in the country.

=== American colonial era ===
When the Americans took control of the Philippine Islands, the new colonial government decided to complete the work. Proposals for the steelwork were advertised for in June and July, 1900. The bids were opened in August, but owing to an irregularity in the opening of bids, all bids were rejected. The matter was finally settled in October 1900, by purchasing the bridge offered by the original lowest bidder. In the meanwhile, nothing had been done toward starting the work on the piers, abutments and approaches. In October, plans and specifications for the abutments, piers and approaches were made, and in the month of November proposals were asked for by advertisement. Bids were opened December 1. The three bids received were of $95,000, $89,542.50, and $53,387.50, all U.S. currency. The lowest bid was accepted. The contract called for the piers and abutments by April 1, and of the entire work by June 1, 1901.

==== Start of construction ====
This bridge was begun December, 1900. The steel for the work arrived on time in March 1901, but the contractors for the masonry had not set a stone in the piers or abutments. The work was then taken from them and carried on by hired labor. To insure the most rapid progress it was decided to use concrete for the body of piers, abutments and approach walls instead of cut stone masonry, and to use a cap of hard cut stone coping. The concrete was bedded with framework of steel rails.

A quarry was opened at Mariveles, Bataan, 30 miles (48 km) west of Manila across Manila Bay, in which coping stone was cut and from which about 800 cubic metres (28,000 cu ft) of broken stone was taken. A stone crusher was installed in Manila at the bridge site and stone was crushed for concrete there.

Work began in the middle of March. By the end of the fiscal year in June, the concrete of both the piers and abutments, aggregating 1,750 cubic metres (62,000 cu ft) was in place. Advertising was done in attempt to secure a contract for erecting the bridge, with not one responsible and reasonable bid.

On August 7, 1901, the present abutments were practically completed and erection of iron work begun. The falsework for the first span was in position, and with the exception of the erecting traveler all was ready to proceed with the erection of the first span. Designated as City Engineer of Manila, P.I.; in charge of the Department of Public Works, Lieutenant Lytle Brown was in charge of the construction at a cost of about $150,000. The work on the piers and abutments of the bridge was completed in August and the superstructure in November, 1901.

The work continued till the following year and the Santa Cruz Bridge was completed and officially opened on March 1, 1902.

==== Destruction ====
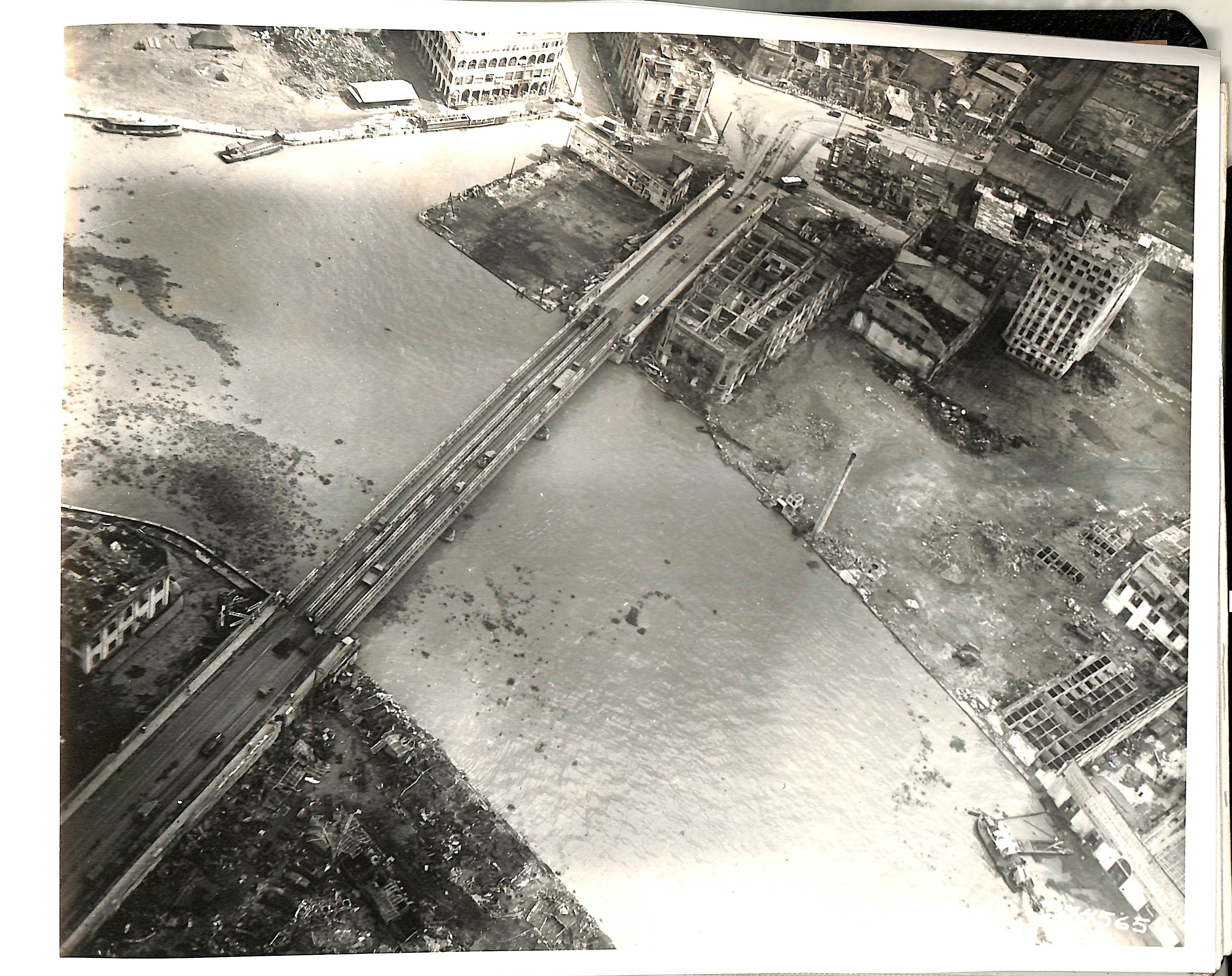
Santa Cruz Bridge, 10 July 1945

During World War II, the Santa Cruz Bridge and all the bridges that span the Pasig River, the river that bisects the city of Manila into north and south, were blown up by the Imperial Japanese Army as the American forces were approaching the city from the north in the Battle of Manila in February 1945.
