= Feast of the Black Nazarene =

Religious festival in Manila, Philippines

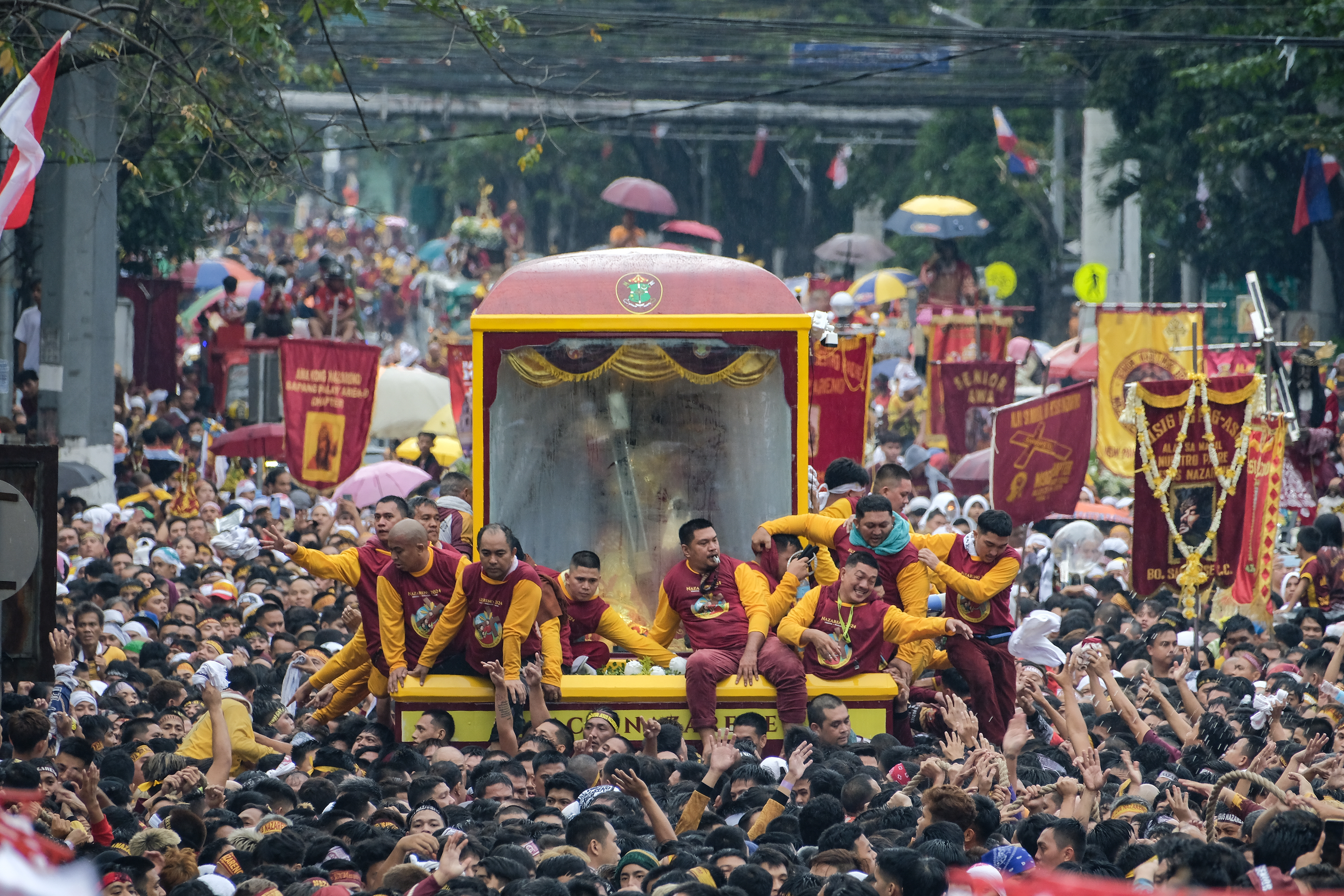
- Traslación of the Jesús Nazareno in 2024
- Official name: Feast of the Jesús Nazareno
- Also called: Traslación ng Jesús Nazareno; Traslación del Nazareno
- Observed by: Quiapo, Manila, Philippines
- Liturgical color: Red
- Type: Cultural, religious (Catholic)
- Significance: Transfer of the image of the Black Nazarene, which is believed to be miraculous by devotees, to Quiapo Church
- Observances: Procession of the Black Nazarene (Traslación), Mass attendance, prayers
- Date: January 9
- Next time: January 9, 2027
- Frequency: Annual
- Related to: Good Friday, Feast of the Holy Name of Jesus

The Feast of the Black Nazarene, officially and liturgically referred to as the Feast of Jesús Nazareno (English: Feast of Jesus the Nazarene), is a devotional Catholic event originating in Manila, Philippines. The commemoration centers on the traslación (lit. 'transfer') of the Black Nazarene, in which a 16th-century image of a black Jesus carrying the cross is carried in a mass procession. The event is observed on January 9 each year since its inception.

== Background ==
=== History ===
The Feast of the Jesús Nazareno marks the octave day of the Feast of Most Holy Name of Jesus (the original dedication of Quiapo Church), traditionally kept on 2 January or the Sunday after, and since 2002 on 3 January. The octave day is celebrated by the annual procession of the image of the Nazareno along the streets of Quiapo. It is now considered the image's national liturgical feast day.

Contrary to popular belief that the Traslación occurred on 9 January 1787, which became the basis of the annual Traslación, no extant historical record verifies the exact date of the image’s translation from Intramuros to Quiapo. There is no definite date of the arrival of the image either. The Augustinian Recollects assert how upon their arrival in the Philippines in 1606, the Nazareno was not among the sacred images they had brought with them. Their arrival was also the basis of the erroneous celebration of "400 years" of the Nazareno in 2006, which began the custom of starting the Traslación at Quirino Grandstand. The original image was enshrined in a church which once stood near the Quirino Grandstand, the Church of San Juan Bautista of the Augustinian Recollects in Bagumbayan, Luneta. Nevertheless, it can be assumed that the image was already in the Philippines before the mid-17th century, as Pope Innocent X authorized the formation of Cofradía del Nuestro Padre Jesús Nazareno (Confraternity of the Lord Jesus the Nazarene) on 20 April 1650.

=== Image ===
The image wears a braided wig made of dark, dyed abacá, along with a golden Crown of Thorns. Attached to the Crown are the traditional "Tres Potencias" ("three powers") halo, variously understood as symbolising the three Persons of the Blessed Trinity; the faculties of will, memory, and understanding in Christ's soul; or his exousia (authority), dunamis (power), and kratos (strength). These three rayos ("rays"), likely an angular variant of the cruciform halo, are used exclusively for and proper to images of Jesus Christ in traditional Filipino and Hispanic iconography to signify his divinity. The original image has lost several fingers over the centuries.

Jesus is shown barefoot and in a genuflecting posture, symbolising the agony and the weight of the Cross, along with the overall pain Christ endured during his Passion. The Cross itself is of black wood tipped with flat, pyramidal brass caps.

=== Debates on the proper feast date ===
There are opposing views on whether to consider the Feast of the Jesús Nazareno as a proper fiesta since the January 9 observance has been thought of as a celebration of the transfer of the image and not the liturgical "feast day" of the image. The annual procession date has its roots in the observance of the traditional Feast of Holy Name of Jesus, the original dedication of Quiapo Church, with Saint John the Baptist as its actual patron saint. Msgr. José Abriol, a former Rector of Quiapo Church, stated the date was chosen as it ends a novena beginning January 1, which according to the pre-1969 General Roman Calendar is the Feast of the Holy Name of Jesus and the Circumcision of Our Lord. It has been argued that the proper liturgical commemoration of the Jesús Nazareno is on Good Friday, which became the basis of a separate procession conducted in the morning of the said day. In 2021, the Basilica's former parochial vicar Douglas Badong explained the term “Feast of the Black Nazarene” is proper in the sense of its similarity to a typical Filipino fiesta. on 6 September 2024, the 38th National Meeting of Diocesan Directors of Liturgy announced the feast would be observed nationwide starting in 2025, as part of the Philippines’ particular national liturgical calendar.

The event is colloquially referred to as "Nazareno" after the image itself, or Traslación after the January 9 procession. The word "Traslación" is often corrupted to the incorrect "translacion".

In October 2024, Quiapo Church officially dropped the word "Black" from its name. Material for the 2025 festivities also followed suit.

== Activities ==
=== Thanksgiving procession ===
The festivities begin with a thanksgiving procession usually held in the late evening of December 30 before the start of its novena the following day, New Year's Eve.

=== Pahalík ===
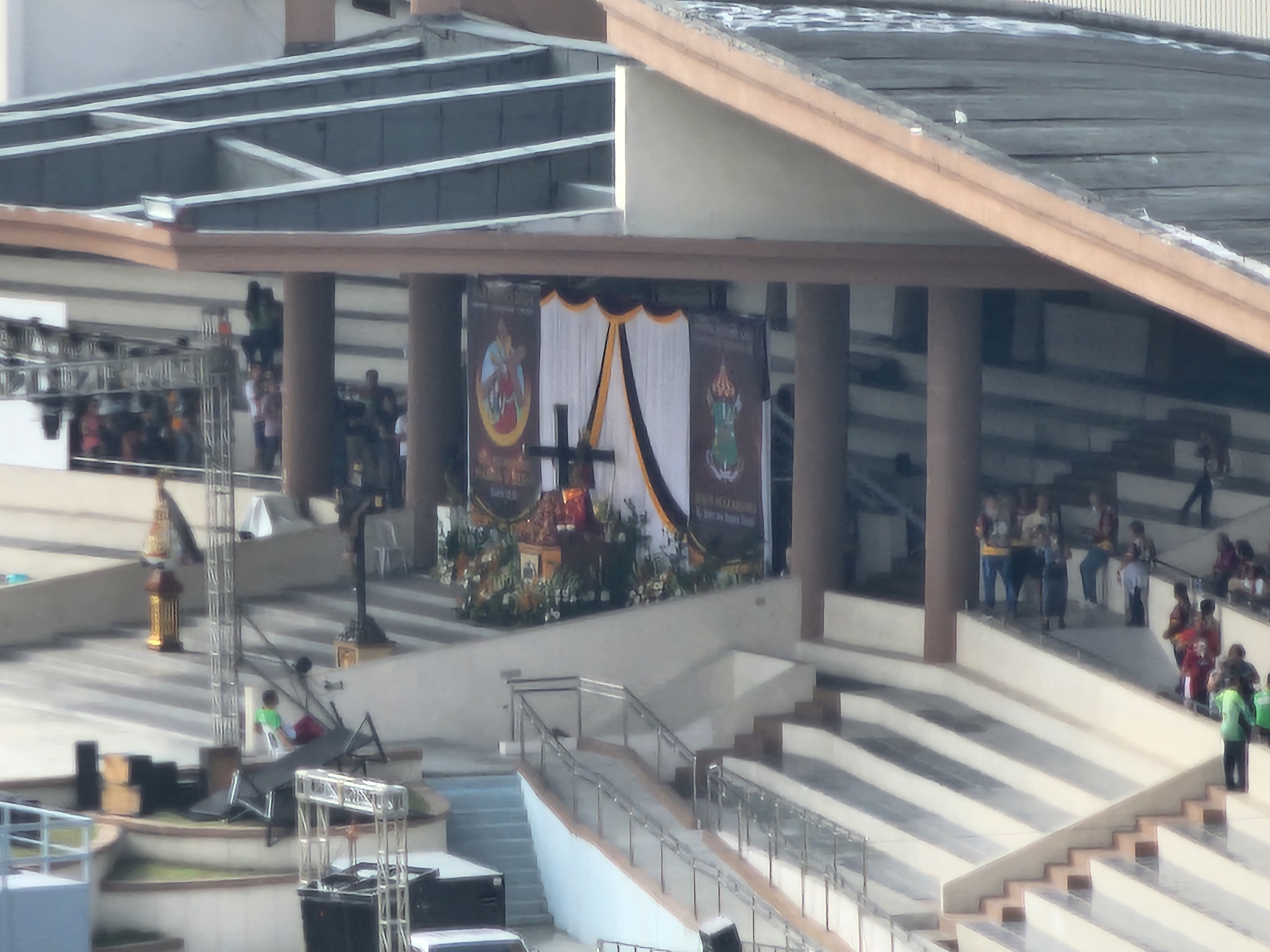
The Jesús Nazareno image at the Quirino Grandstand during the traditional Pahalík.

The Pahalík ("kissing") rite is usually done a day or a few days before the actual start of the procession at the Quirino Grandstand, on which the official processional image is placed at the center alongside a replica, either one of the 5 officially sanctioned by Quiapo Church, for the actual veneration itself. Devotees form long lines outside the Grandstand, waiting for hours to be able to touch the image of the Nazareno.

The wiping of cloth on the image, which is also done during the actual procession itself, follows the folk belief that cloth can absorb the powers of a holy object, usually and specifically its curative abilities. This sanctity-through-contact descends from the ancient custom of ex brandea, cloth wiped on the bodies or tombs of the Twelve Apostles, itself part of the wider category of third-class relics.

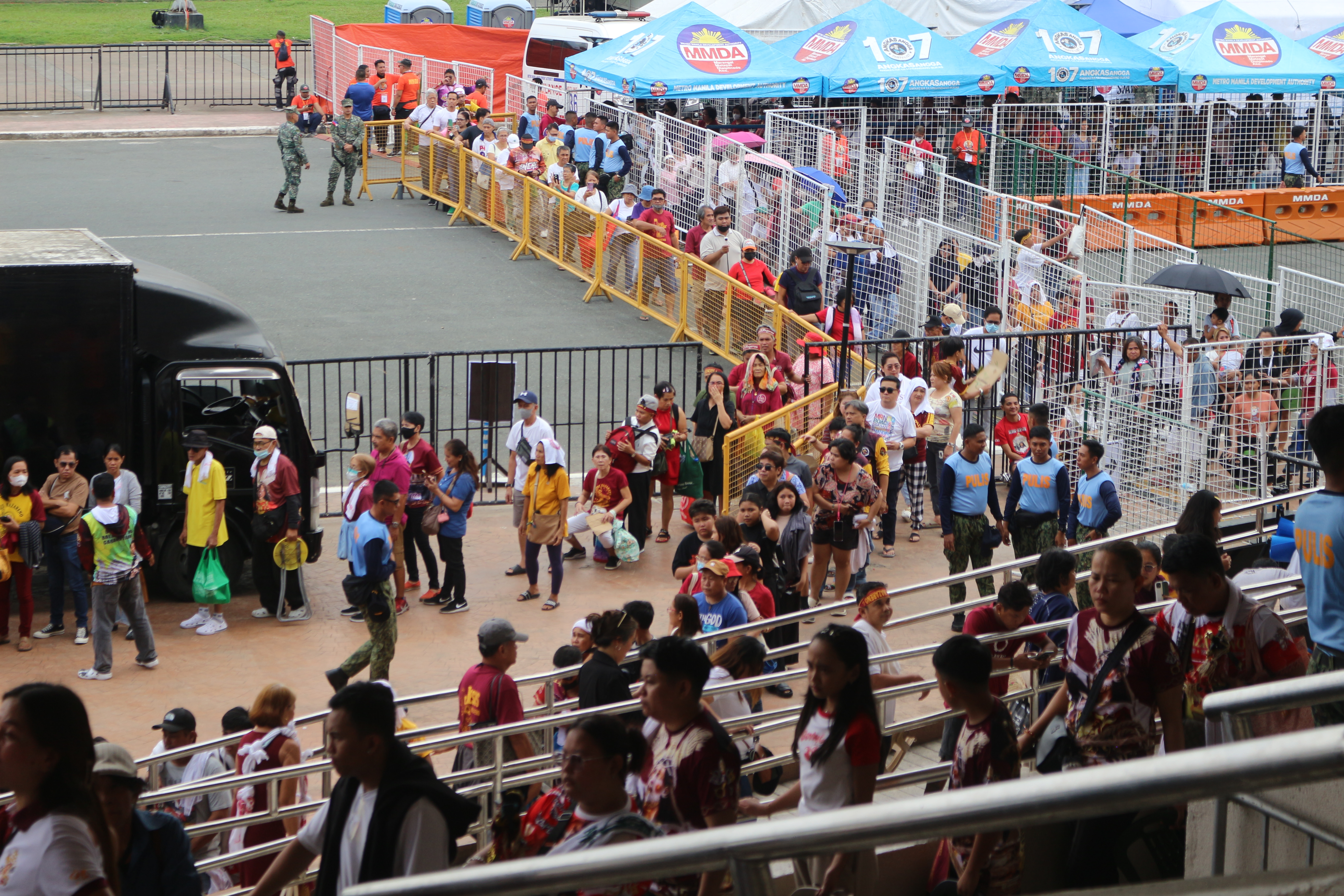
Queue of devotees leading to the Quirino Grandstand

Despite the name, kissing the image is prohibited due to health concerns. Devotees instead used handkerchiefs or small towels to touch the image. In 2021, Pahalík was renamed Pagpupugay ("paying tribute"), when devotees were only allowed to look at the image due to the COVID-19 pandemic. However, the latter is still used alternatively.

=== Traslación ===
The main highlight of the Feast of the Jesús Nazareno is the Traslación, taken from the Spanish term for "passage" or "movement". It started in 2006 that marked the 400th year of the feast.

Every January 9, the Traslación of the Jesús Nazareno, commemorating the "solemn transfer" of the image's copy from San Nicolás de Tolentino in Intramuros to Quiapo, makes its way along the streets of Quiapo. Traslación is now the term used for the annual procession.

In recent years, the processional route was altered due to a rise in accidents, to afford other neighborhoods off the traditional route a chance to participate, and because of structural deficiencies in nearby bridges. It is normally only a school holiday for the schools near the processional route, but for the first time in the city's history, Manila Mayor Joseph Estrada in 2014 declared the day a special non-working holiday due to the impassability of some thoroughfares and projected congestion in others. His successors as City Mayor kept the practice. Since 2024, President Bongbong Marcos reaffirmed the status of the day as a city-wide holiday.

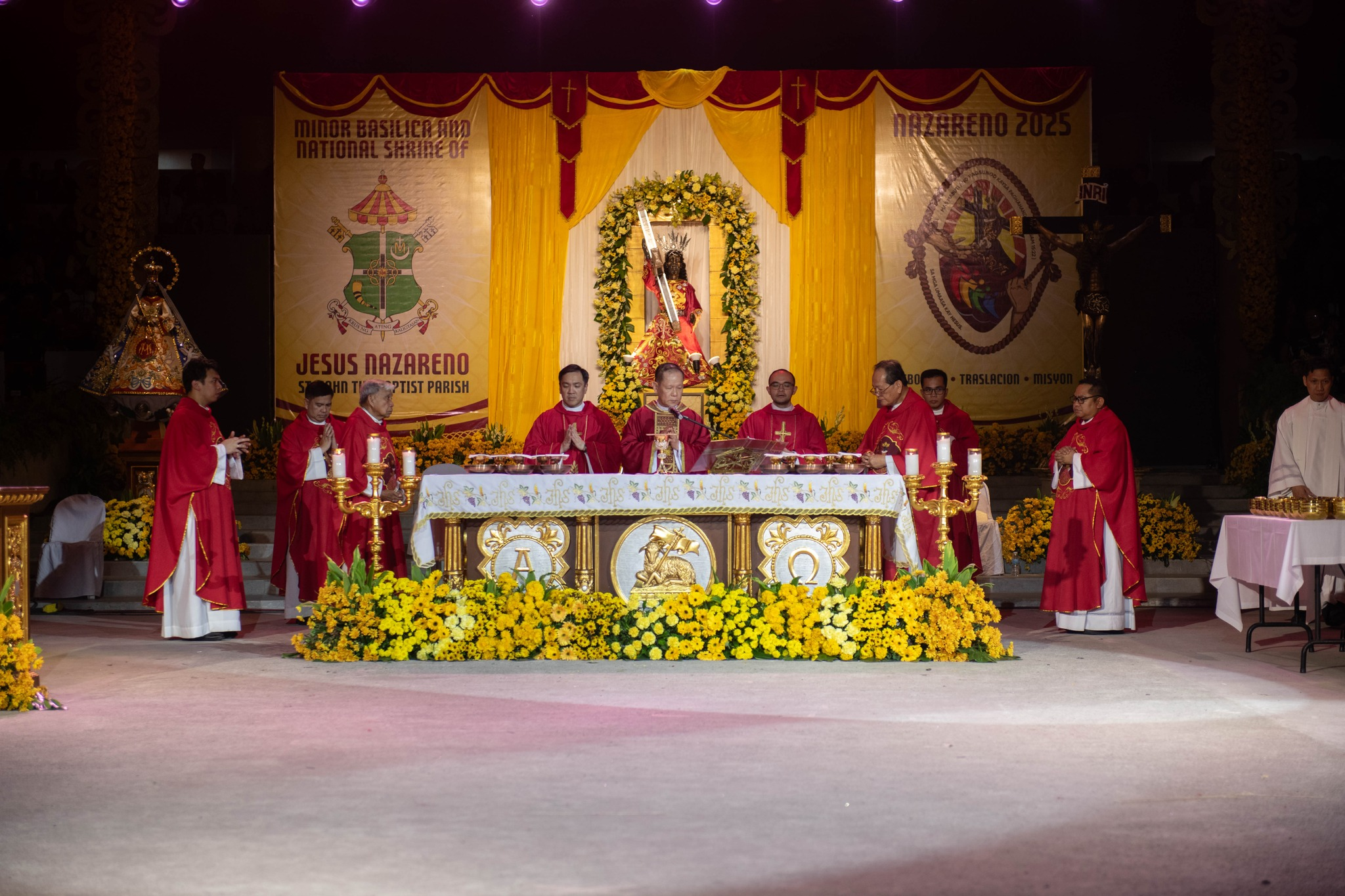
Cardinal Jose Advincula, the archbishop of Manila, presiding over the 2025 Misa Mayor.

As per custom, the Nazareno leaves the Minor Basilica a day or two before the annual procession, either in a public fashion or clandestinely. Since 2020, the procession begins at around 04:30 AM PST (GMT+8) after a solemn midnight High Mass (Filipino: Misa Mayor) at the Quirino Grandstand presided by the Archbishop of Manila or a high-ranking prelate followed hours later by the Morning Prayer of the Liturgy of the Hours. It ends in Quiapo in late night of the same day or early the following morning, depending on how long the image has travelled. Some participants choose to wait for the image inside the Minor Basilica to greet it, while most devotees walk throughout the whole processional route.

All devotees wear maroon and yellow like the image, and they walk barefoot as a form of penance and in emulation of Christ's walk to Golgotha. Attendees include families of devotees, tourists, and members of devotees' associations throughout the country and overseas, all carrying their long estandartes (religious gonfalon) usually coloured maroon or white and embroidered in gold and emblazoned with the image and the association name.

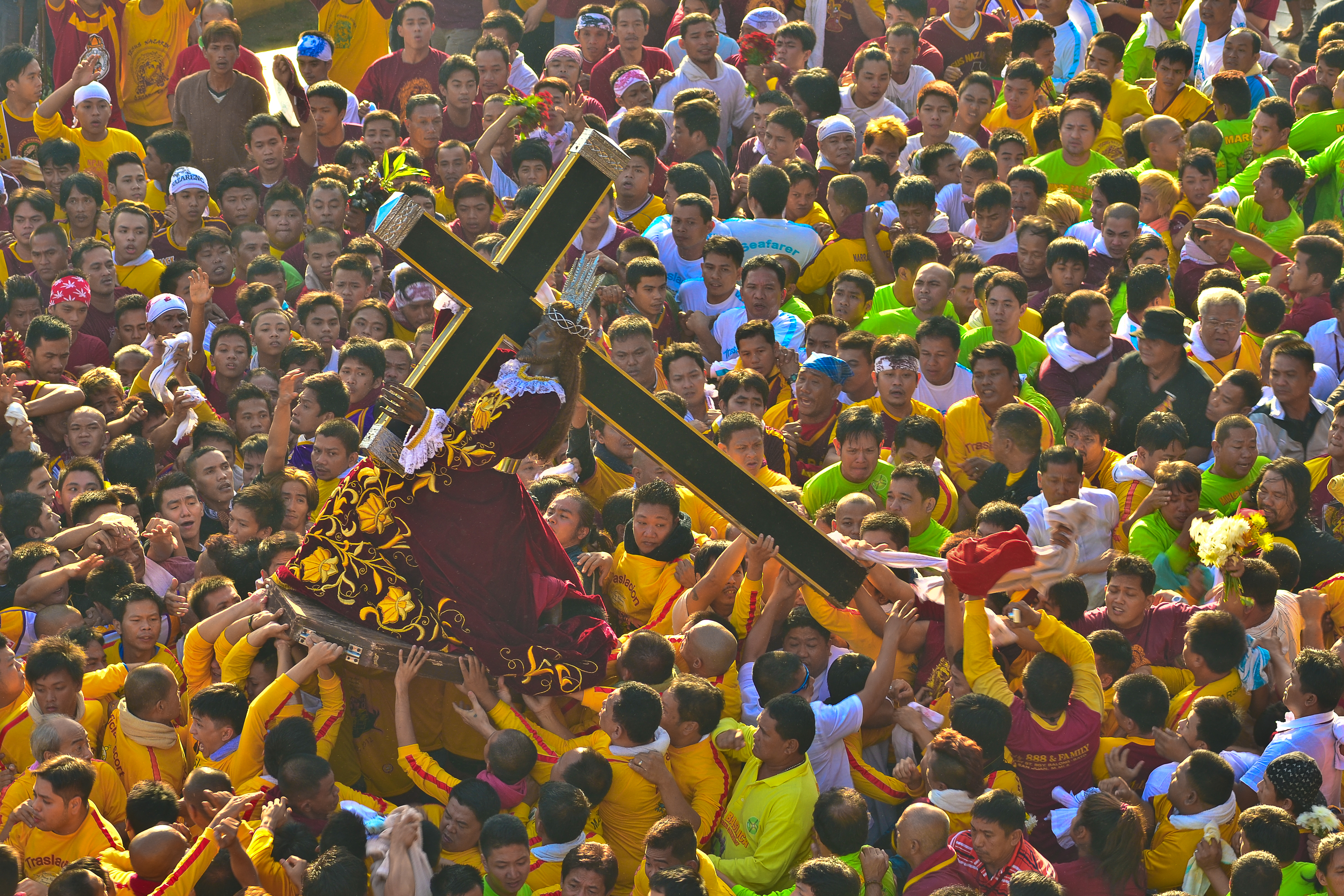
Marshals in yellow lift the Nazareno onto its ándas at the start of the Traslación. The peana or base of the image can be seen under the hem of its robes.

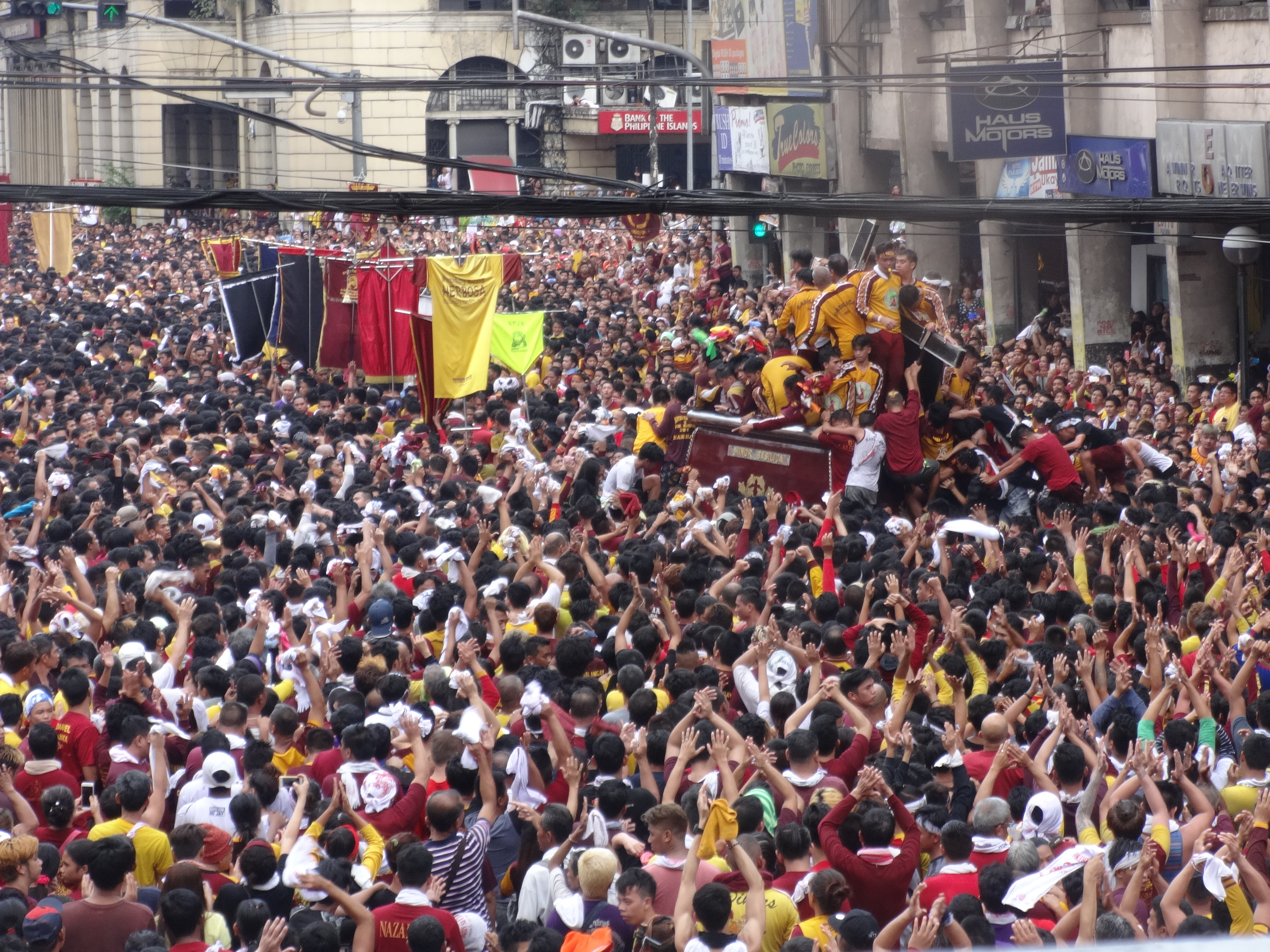
Devotees around the "Ándas" of the Jesús Nazareno traversing Santa Cruz, Manila in 2018

The Jesús Nazareno is processed upon the Ándas, and traditionally only men were permitted to be mamámasán ("bearers"), the devotees pulling the wheeled ándas by its two large ropes. In recent years, female mamámasán have been allowed to participate, with pregnant women barred for safety reasons. There is also the custom of vying to touch the Kanang Balikat, or the rope to the side of the image's right shoulder. Folk belief holds it to possesses great sanctity, as it is closer to imitating the image bearing the Cross.

Marshals from the Minor Basilica, known as the Hijos del Nazareno (transl. "Sons of the Nazarene"), form an honor guard around the image, and are the only people permitted to ride the ándas for the duration of the Traslación. The Hijos – distinguishes from maroon-clad devotees by their yellow and white shirts – have the primary task of protecting the icon from damage and directing the mamámasán in front and behind using hand gestures, voice commands (sometimes through a megaphone), and whistle signals. In addition, they help devotees clamber up onto the ándas to briefly touch the icon's cross, and wipe the image with cloths tossed at them.

From 2021 to 2023, the annual Traslación was cancelled due to the COVID-19 pandemic, resorting instead to alternatives like Padungaw ("viewing") of the Black Nazarene and hourly Masses at Quiapo Church. However, in 2022, Masses were held behind closed doors due to a huge spike of COVID-19 cases brought by the SARS-CoV-2 Omicron variant, resorting devotees to attend online. An alternative procession, known as the "Walk of Faith", was held on January 8, 2023, with an estimated 88,000 devotees joining the procession. Virtual processions using online game platforms such as Roblox and Minecraft have also been held by youth ministries in lieu of in-person ceremonies due to the pandemic, the practice of which still continues in parallel with the actual ceremony after the return of the Traslación in 2024.

After a long hiatus, the Traslación resumed in 2024. A new design of the ándas, built by Sarao Motors, was unveiled for that year's procession, featuring the image enclosed in a thick tempered and laminated glass, onboard lights for illumination at night, a sound system, and a built-in CCTV camera. Organizers and authorities prohibited devotees from climbing the ándas, but many ignored, believing that climbing and touching the image would bring miracles.

The ándas was redesigned in 2025 to include an exhaust fan for ventilation and reduced moisture, as well as an overhead glass panel. Tires used on forklifts were also adopted, in addition to steel tires, and improvements were made to make it lightweight.

In 2026, the Misa Mayor at the Quirino Grandstand was presided over by Most Rev. Rufino Sescon Jr., fifth Bishop of Balanga in Bataan since March 1, 2025 and former Rector of Quiapo Church, in place of Cardinal Jose Advincula, Archbishop of Manila, who was in the Vatican for the Closing of the Holy Door of St. Peter’s Basilica on January 6 and the Extraordinary Consistory called by Pope Leo XIV on January 7–8. This year’s Misa Mayor marked a break from the tradition of the Archbishop of Manila presiding over the celebration. Instead, Advincula presided over one of the Novena Masses in preparation for the Feast. For that year, the andas was upgraded into a motorized one applying lessons from past editions, with a driver at the helm of the redesigned vehicle, which will still be human powered, and additional wheels, while additional ventilation measures were applied.

==== La Mirata or the Dungaw Rite ====
The traditional Dungaw, a Tagalog calque of the rite's Spanish name Mirata, "to see" or "to view", involves the Jesús Nazareno, coming from Hidalgo Street, being made to stop briefly at Plaza del Carmen, a square along the southwest flank of the neo-Gothic San Sebastian Church, before proceeding towards Bilibid Viejo Street. The rite, which was discontinued in the early 1900s for still-unknown reasons, was revived and reincorporated into the Traslación on January 9, 2014, after the discovery of old documents attesting to its practice.

The resident Recollect priests remove the image of Our Lady of Mount Carmel from the principal niche of the retablo mayor, or use a replica which is termed its vicária. The image is dressed in its primera vestida, used only on the most solemn occasions, in its camarín, or private chamber. Only Augustinian nuns and other women may enter the camarín at this point. Men, including priests, all exit the room as they are forbidden from watching the Virgin "change clothes". During the entire vesting process, the rosary is recited.

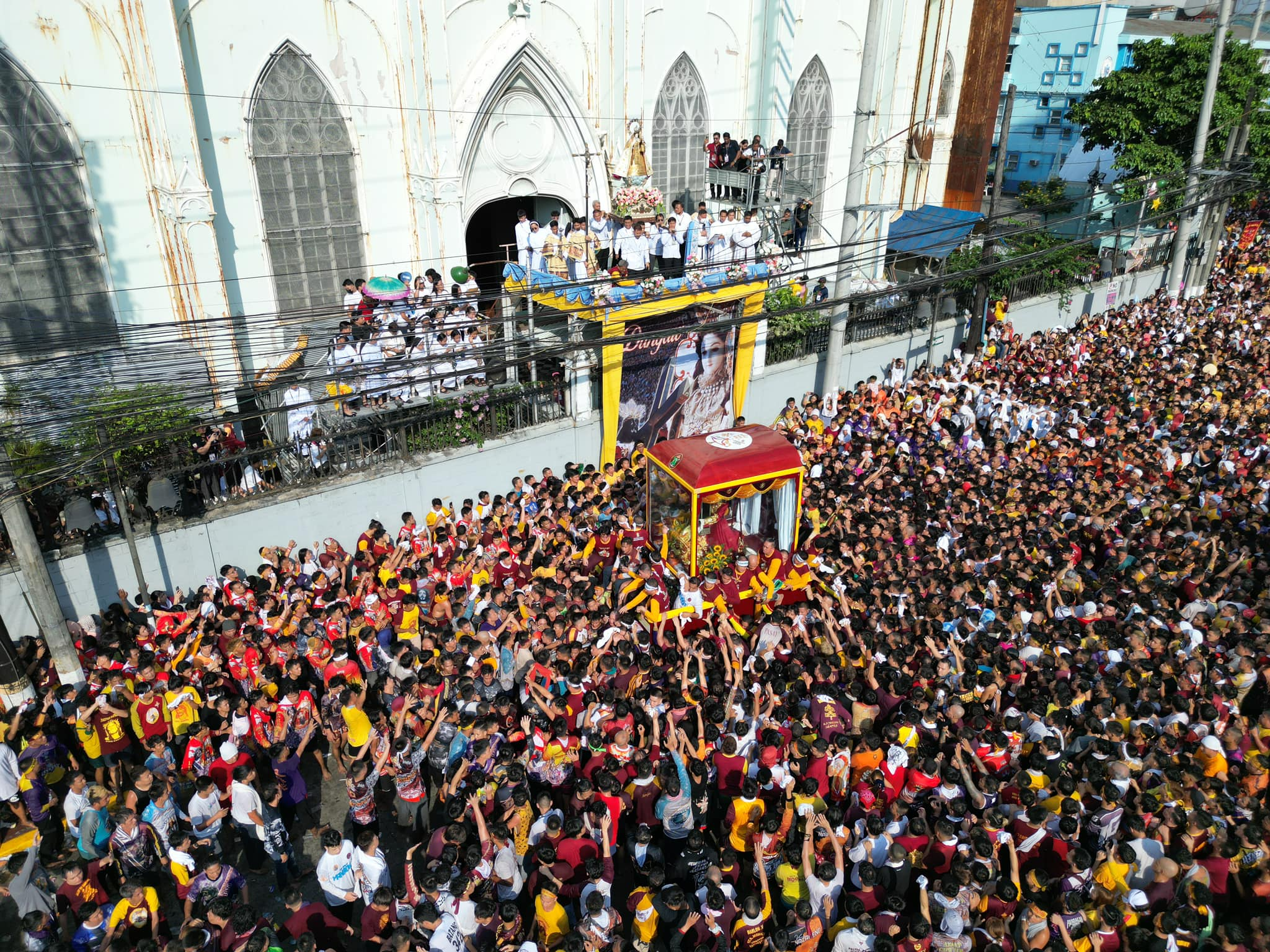
The images of Our Lady of Mount Carmel and the Black Nazarene during the 2024 Dungaw rite.

Once fully dressed in precious robes and regalia, the original image, which was given to the Recollects in 1617 by a Carmelite nunnery in Mexico City, is then solemnly and silently processed on its own small ándas to a temporary scaffold erected at the southwest face of the church. There, it is lifted up by several priests and attendants to "see" and "meet" the Jesús Nazareno as devotees fall silent, the Virgin sometimes made to "bow" to the Nazareno three times. A Gospel lesson is followed by general intercessions, and several prayers (often the Lord's Prayer and the Hail Mary), are chanted fervently. The Basilica's bells are rung throughout the short prayer service.

The presiding priests then cheer "¡Viva Jesús Nazareno!" to which the crowd replies "¡Viva!" and "¡Viva Virgen del Carmen!" to which the customary reply is "¡Guapa!"; this acclamation is done thrice. The priests then slowly turn the Virgin's image so that it "watches" the Black Nazarene and its procession depart the vicinity of Plaza del Carmen. The image of the Virgin is then returned to the high altar, or the replica returned to its proper place, while the choir sings the devotional hymn Nuestro Padre Jesús Nazareno.

Theologically, the Dungaw rite reflects the fourth Traditional Station of the Cross, where Christ meets his Mother, the Virgin Mary, en route to Golgotha, and reflects the closeness of Christ and his Mother. The rite is also seen as a "courtesy" of the Virgin's image towards the Black Nazarene, as the former's shrine is along the processional route.

In 2026, the procession saw a historic departure from tradition during the Dungaw rite in the early hours of January 10. For the first time, the ándas was temporarily housed at the San Sebastian Church to allow the devotees, medical teams, and security personnel to rest, as the procession had already reached a record-breaking 24 hours. Despite the pause, the procession resumed its course back towards Quiapo Church shortly thereafter.

==== Length ====
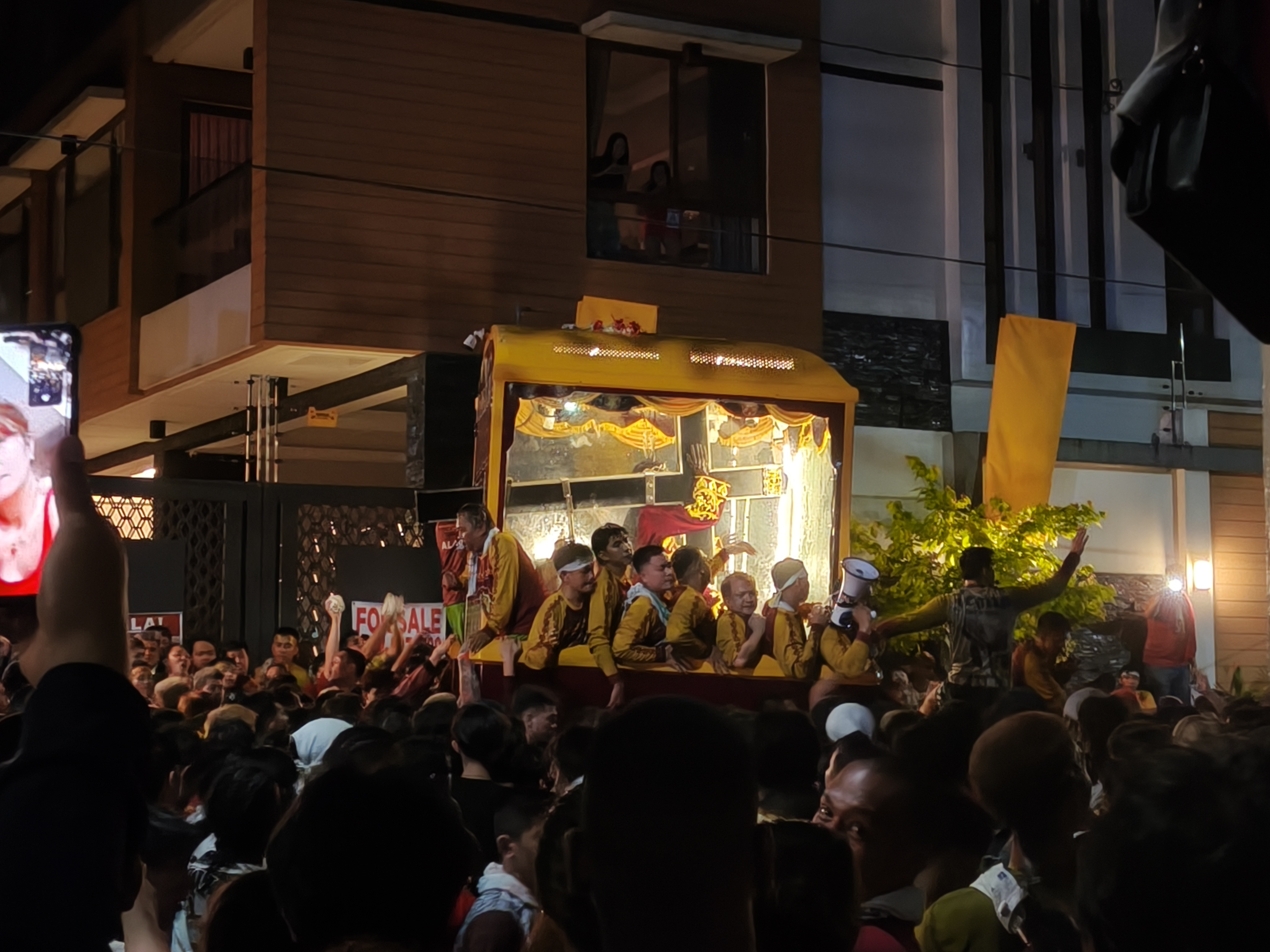
The 2026 Traslación was the longest in the ceremony's history, lasting 30 hours, 50 minutes, and 1 second. It is also the third most crowded on record.

The 2026 Traslación is the longest in the ceremony’s history, the image entering Plaza Miranda at 10:50AM (PHST) on January 10 over 30 hours since departing Quirino Grandstand. The slow progress of the ándas is attributed to aggressive devotees, and reports of snapped lubid (ropes) and damaged wheels emerged as early as the start of the procession. The ándas also remarkably spent four to five hours on Arlegui Street alone, which prompted Quiapo Church authorities to estimate the entire procession would take over 21 hours to finish — well beyond the intended goal of lasting only 15 hours.

The 2012 Traslación ended 22 hours after leaving the Grandstand, arriving at Plaza Miranda around 05:15 AM PST on January 10. The procession took longer than usual since the wheels of the ándas broke early on at a point near Manila Hotel, while the rope broke some distance away near Liwasang Bonifacio. There were also reports of groups of devotees diverting the image from the previously defined route in order to pass by business establishments outside the traditional route for them to receive the good luck and blessings of the image. The same duration was also recorded for the 2017 and 2018 Traslacións.

Meanwhile, the 2007 Traslación (the first to be held there for the occasion of the "400th Traslación", as previous processions were only held around the district of Quiapo) was meanwhile the fastest procession in history at nine hours from the Grandstand to Quiapo Church. Following new measures and a route change in 2020, which decreased the length of the procession by 300 meters (980 ft) by passing through Ayala Bridge instead of the usual Jones Bridge (2014–2019) or the traditional MacArthur Bridge (used 2007, 2009–2013), the 2020 procession took sixteen hours and thirty-four minutes, the third-fastest in history, an improvement from the recorded time of twenty-one hours in 2019. This was further shortened to fourteen hours, fifty-nine minutes, and ten seconds in 2024, with the introduction of the new ándas. Despite using the same route and ándas, the 2025 procession took 20 hours and 45 minutes to complete after the two ropes broke during the procession.

==== Crowd participation ====
An estimated 8,124,050 devotees participated in the 2025 procession: 15.89% at the Quirino Grandstand; 4.76% on the route; 79.35% in and around the church. The number was higher by 24.36% compared to the previous year with 6,532,501 devotees, thus becoming one of the biggest crowds in the religious festival's history.

Such high figures were reported even prior to the pandemic; for instance, the number of participated devotees in 2015 was placed at nine million.

In 2014, media outlets reported that there were 10 million participants—supposedly a record high—which, according to the National Capital Region Police Office, included a purported three million at the pre-procession mass at Luneta. However, this only caused confusion as the National Disaster Risk Reduction and Management Council estimated only 300,000 devotees in the procession and the masses. The Church later explained that the figure covers attendance at the activities which included the pasasalamat and the pahalík. Meanwhile, Metro Manila Development Authority chairperson Francis Tolentino placed the number of the participants in the festivities at 10–12 million.

Participants and Duration of Traslación since its inception
Year	Crowd Participants	Duration	Ref.
2007	~1,000,000	~9 hours	
2008	~2,000,000	~10 hours	
2009	~1,000,000	~12 hours	
2010	~2,000,000	15 hours, 30 minutes, 4 seconds	
2011	~7,000,000	14 hours, 21 minutes, 3 seconds	
2012	~8,000,000	22 hours, 14 minutes, 14 seconds	
2013	~9,000,000	18 hours, 3 minutes, 32 seconds	
2014	~10,000,000	18 hours, 25 minutes, 4 seconds	
2015	~12,000,000	18 hours, 53 minutes, 8 seconds	
2016	~9,000,000	20 hours, 6 minutes, 45 seconds	
2017	~3,500,000	22 hours, 19 minutes, 11 seconds	
2018	~6,300,000	21 hours, 54 minutes, 0 second	
2019	~4,000,000	21 hours, 12 minutes, 0 second	
2020	~3,300,000	16 hours, 33 minutes, 11 seconds	
2021	Cancelled due to the COVID-19 pandemic		
2022	Cancelled due to the COVID-19 pandemic		
2023	Cancelled due to the COVID-19 pandemic		
2024	6,523,501	14 hours, 59 minutes, 10 seconds	
2025	8,124,050	20 hours, 45 minutes, 4 seconds	
2026	9,640,290	30 hours, 50 minutes, 1 second	

==== Injuries and casualties ====
The Traslación is notorious for the casualties that result from the jostling and congestion of the crowds pulling the ándas. The injuries and even deaths of devotees are brought upon by one or several factors including heat, fatigue, or being trampled upon by the crowd.

== Liturgical observance ==
Red is the liturgical color for the Feast of Jesus the Nazarene. In the absence of any national liturgical directive prior to 2025, the decision to celebrate the feast was left to individual parishes and communities. In 2024, the Archdiocese of Manila, and the rector of Quiapo Church at the time, Rufino Sescon, proposed to the Holy See for the feast’s nationwide observance. On 6 September that year, at the end of the 38th National Meeting of Diocesan Directors of Liturgy in Antipolo, it was announced the Feast of the Jesus the Nazarene would observed and added to the Philippine’s national liturgical calendar beginning in 2025.

Propers for the Liturgy of the Word on this feast are similar to those for the Feast of the Exaltation of the Holy Cross.

- First Reading: Numbers 21:4b-9
- Responsorial Psalm: Psalm 78 (77):1-2, 34–35, 36–37, 38
- Second Reading: Philippians 2:6-11
- Gospel: John 3:13-17

Since 2023, thirty-three hourly Masses are held at Quiapo Church from the first Vigil Mass on January 8 at 3:00 p.m. PST, until the last Mass at 11:00 p.m. on the feast day itself. This is to accommodate the many pilgrims at the basilica, while the number 33 references the traditional age of Jesus at the crucifixion.

== Observances outside Manila ==
=== In the Philippines ===
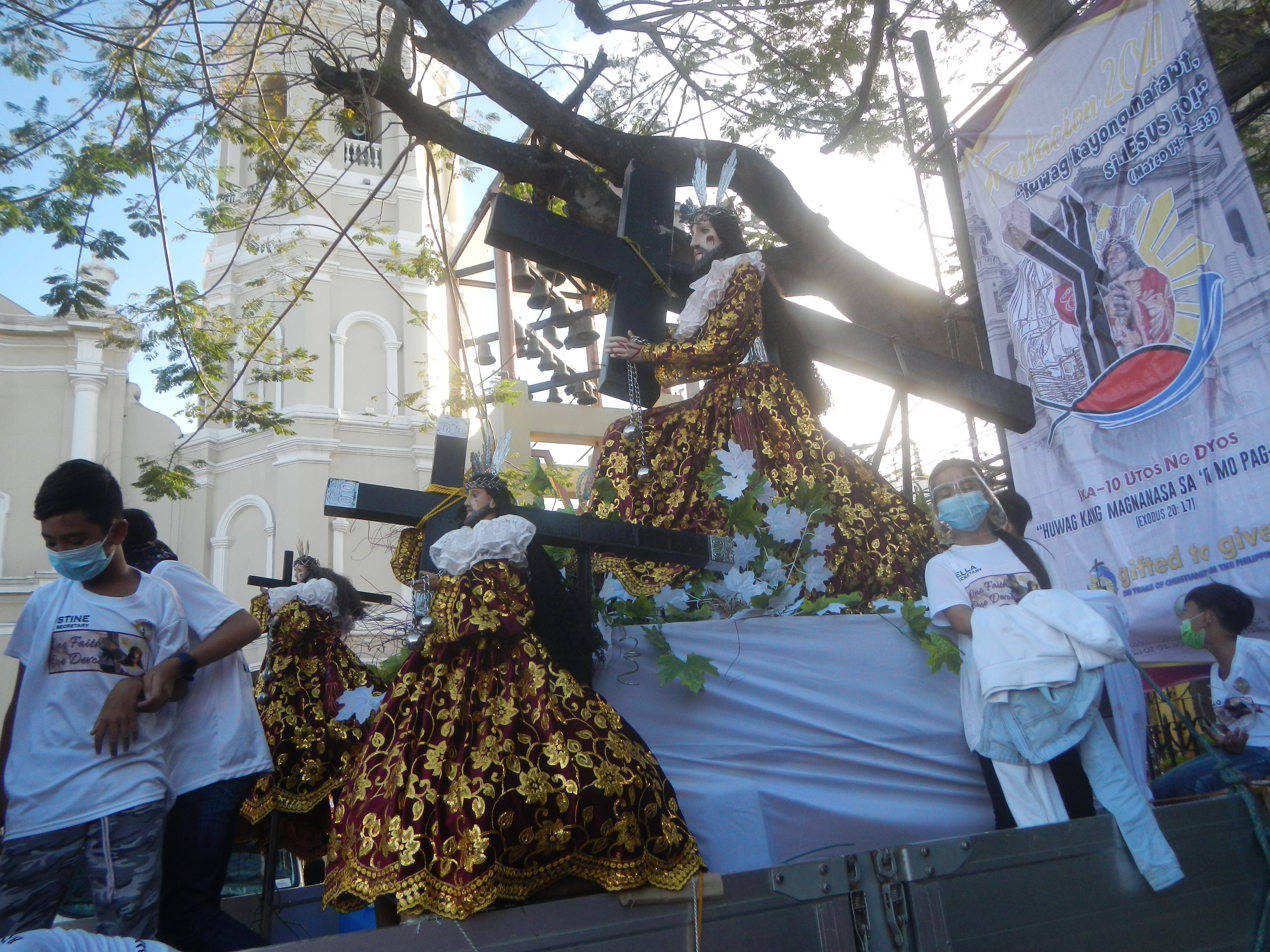
Traslación in Malolos, Bulacan.

Similar processions replicating the Traslación are also held on January 9 in other parts of the country. The largest of these is held in Cagayan de Oro, which uses an official replica of the image given by the Minor Basilica in 2009. It has since become a center for the devotion in Mindanao.

On March 4, 2014, an official replica from Quiapo Church arrived at the Old Chapel of Saint Rock the Healer Mission Center, Bishop's Compound, Barangay Cawayan, Catarman, Northern Samar. Since then, many devotees across Northern Samar came to venerate the sacred image, especially on its novena day of Friday. At that time, the said mission center was constructing a bigger church. The first Traslación was held on January 9, 2015, when the image was solemnly transferred from the old church to the new, unfinished one. Devotees came from Northern Samar and the rest of the island. On 12 September 2016, the new church was dedicated and consecrated by Cardinal Luis Antonio Tagle. The event was concelebrated by priests from Quiapo Church, Felomino G. Bactol, the Bishop of Naval, Bishop Emeritus Anghel Hobayan of the Diocese of Catarman, Emmanuel C. Trance, the Bishop of Catarman, the Mission Center's first administrator Alan Abalon, and the Mission Center's second administrator and rector, Rico M. Manook. The event saw devotees from across the Eastern Visayas, and during the celebrations the Mission Center was elevated to the status of diocesan shrine, making it the first Visayan church with such rank for this image.

On 18 August 2019, the diocesan shrine became a parish church, making it the first barangay-based parish in the whole Diocese of Catarman. Its current title is Saint Rock the Healer Parish, Diocesan Shrine of the Nuestro Padre Jesús Nazareno.

=== Other countries ===
Filipinos overseas have brought the tradition of a procession and Mass honoring of the Nazareno image to countries such as Australia and the United States. As in Quiapo, a copy of the image is paraded through the streets or within the parish bounds, with devotees reciting prayers in its wake.

In September 2012, a replica of the Black Nazarene was canonically enshrined at Saint Catherine of Siena Catholic Parish in Reseda, California, United States. A procession in the United Arab Emirates made it the first Traslación in the Middle East on January 4, 2019, the first Friday of that month.

== Transportation during Traslación ==
Travel within the City of Manila during the Traslación every January 9 might be difficult as heavy traffic is expected. Most jeepneys and buses use alternate routes for the day to avoid the procession, thus creating additional travel time. Some public rail transport systems such as the LRT Lines 1 and 2 accommodate barefoot devotees when it is typically prohibited to ride barefoot.

Traffic rerouting is implemented on the annual procession and the day before, and is enforced by the Manila Police District with reinforcements from the Philippine National Police and, since 2014, the Armed Forces of the Philippines and the Metropolitan Manila Development Authority. The Philippine Coast Guard guards stretches of the Pasig River along the Ayala (since 2020), Jones (until 2019), MacArthur (until 2013) and Quezon bridges to ensure the safe passage of the procession.

A similar scenario can be experienced by tourists and travellers in Cagayan de Oro and in Catarman, Northern Samar during the yearly processions of the sacred image, as well as in other towns and cities where replica images are brought out in procession on this day.

== In popular media ==
- Lino Brocka's 1980 film Bona starring Nora Aunor opens with the scenes of a traslación.
- The Filipino novel Revolution: 80 Days (2022) features the traslación as a key event.
- The Filipino drama action series FPJ's Batang Quiapo prominently features the Traslacion and the image of the Black Nazarene throughout its run. Principal photography of the series began on January 9, 2023, the same day as the celebration.
