= 2025 demonstrations in support of Rodrigo Duterte =

2025 protests in the Philippines

Demonstrations in support of Rodrigo Duterte
- Date: January 13, 2025 – present
- Location: Worldwide (primarily in the Philippines)
- Caused by: Impeachment of Sara Duterte; Arrest of Rodrigo Duterte and his subsequent surrender by the Philippine government to the International Criminal Court in The Hague, Netherlands; Political corruption
- Goals: Release of Rodrigo Duterte; Dissolution of 20th Congress; Regime change and removal of President Bongbong Marcos from power; Installation of Vice President Sara Duterte as President
- Methods: Demonstrations; Protest marches; Online activism; Civil resistance; Boycott
- Status: Ongoing

A series of protests are taking place across the Philippines in response to the arrest of Rodrigo Duterte, a former president, by the Philippine government. Protests began on March 11, 2025, the day of Duterte's arrest and subsequent surrender to the International Criminal Court in The Hague, Netherlands via a government-chartered Gulfstream G550 jet that departed Manila at 23:03 PHT (UTC+08:00).

Duterte was arrested amid an escalating feud between the Marcos and Duterte political families, although President Bongbong Marcos himself expressed melancholy regarding the arrest. Analysts have described Duterte's arrest and surrender to the ICC as remarkably quick and trouble-free, as well as a victory for the Marcos faction in their feud with the Dutertes.

With less than two years in office, more Filipinos have become dissatisfied with the administration of Bongbong Marcos, according to the survey conducted by Publicus Asia from November 29 to December 4, 2023. Economic concerns, rising inflation, joblessness, low wages, and a perceived lack of productivity are some of the emerging factors behind the drop in pro-administration support. The survey also noted that the "Duterte effect" still persists, with opposition parties grappling with the discreditation of the previous administration. By 2025, a new survey by Publicus Asia showed growing anti-admin sentiment, and a growing pessimism about the country's state, leadership direction, and economic and financial outlook. Pro-administration support dropped steeply from 28% in Q1 2024 to 15% in Q1 2025. Meanwhile, the national outlook is at its weakest since 2022, with all economic indicators on a decline.

Other anti-government protests were also held in relation to the alleged corruption in the 2025 national budget, PhilHealth budget cuts and the impeachment of Sara Duterte.

== Protests ==
=== January 13: National Rally for Peace and prelude ===
National Rally for Peace venues.

The National Rally for Peace were a series of demonstrations organized on January 13, 2025, led by the Iglesia ni Cristo in support of the statement of President Bongbong Marcos in opposition to the impeachment efforts against Vice President Sara Duterte. It was primarily held at the Quirino Grandstand in Manila on January 13, 2025. Other cities or municipalities served as secondary venues.

=== February 11: Mandaue city protests ===
At least 20,000 people protested against the impeachment of Vice President Sara Duterte in Mandaue, Cebu.

=== March 11: Arrest of Rodrigo Duterte ===
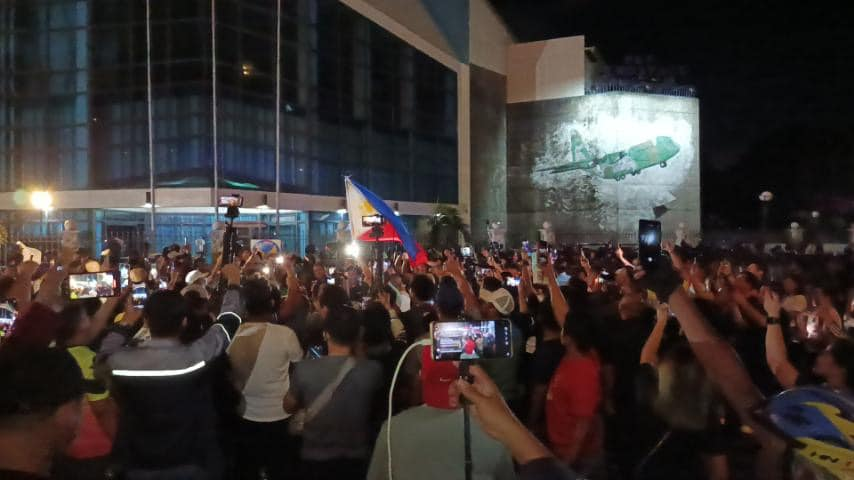
Supporters of Rodrigo Duterte just outside Villamor Air Base protesting his arrest.

=== March 15: Metro Manila motorcade and prayer rally ===
A series of motorcade were held in different parts of Metro Manila, culminating in a prayer rally at Liwasang Bonifacio in Ermita, Manila. It was attended by around 2,000 people. Among those who were present in the rally are Apollo Quiboloy, the controversial pastor and founder of Kingdom of Jesus Christ, as well as Senators Bong Go and Ronald "Bato" dela Rosa, all of whom were critical of the Marcos administration.

=== March 16: Araw ng Dabaw protests ===
On March 16, during the annual celebration of the Araw ng Dabaw (lit. 'Day of Davao'), thousands of citizens of Davao City marched the city's street wearing black in protest of Duterte's arrest. The citizens also called for Duterte to be repatriated back to the Philippines.

=== March 24: Protests at The Hague ===
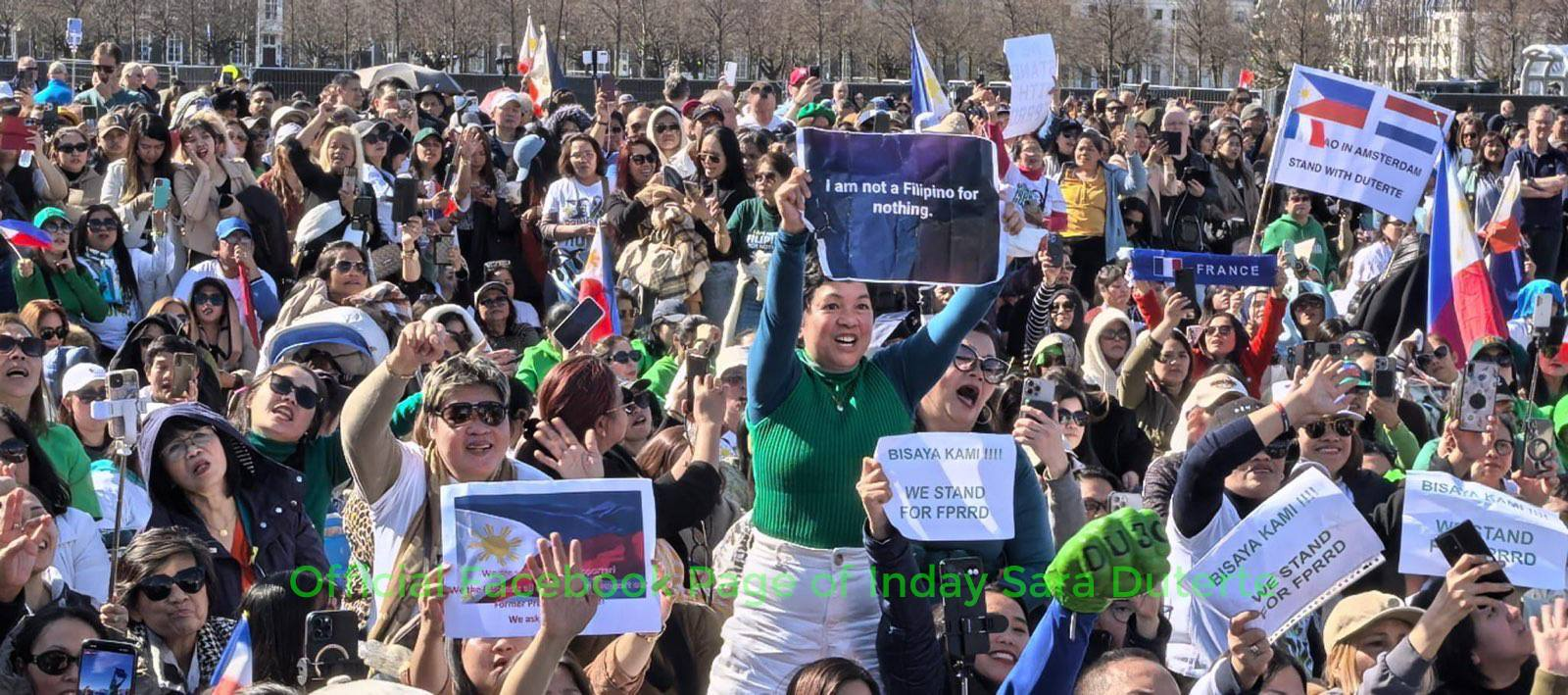
Over 5,000 supporters rallied at Malieveld in The Hague, Netherlands, on March 23, 2025, to protest the arrest of Rodrigo Duterte.

Thousands of Overseas Filipino Workers (OFWs) from across Europe gathered at The Hague for a peaceful rally to protest the arrest and detention of Duterte, which was viewed as an attack on Philippine sovereignty and they called for Duterte's release.

=== March 28 ===
==== Duterte's birthday protests ====
On March 28, during the birthday of Rodrigo Duterte, thousands of citizens of Davao City took to the streets to celebrate his birthday and protests his arrest. An estimated 60,000-100,000 crowd were present at the protests.

Police also blocked a convoy of at least 100 motorcycle riders near Malacañang Palace in the capital city Manila, who were brandishing posters that reads "Bring Him Home".

In Qatar, several Filipinos were arrested by the Qatari authorities for unauthorized political demonstrations.

In Canada, the Archdiocese of Montreal revoked its permission to use Roman Catholic churches in its jurisdiction for gatherings in support of Duterte due to accusation of human rights violations by Duterte as well as his prior contemptuous remarks against the church. Gatherings were moved to other venues such as the Mackenzie King Park.

==== Overseas Filipino Workers zero remittance week (March 28 to April 4) ====
Overseas Filipino Workers are organizing a protest called "zero remittance week" from March 28 to April 4 to show their disapproval of Duterte's arrest. Meanwhile, Presidential Spokesperson Claire Castro appealed to the OFW Duterte supporters to be "level-headed" and more "understanding" to the situation, as the Philippine government is only complying with its obligations to the international community.

=== Boycott of Vice Ganda's endorsements ===
On August 9, celebrity Vice Ganda held a concert at the Araneta Coliseum where he lampooned the Arrest of Rodrigo Duterte, his pre-election promise to ride a jetski to Scarborough Shoal in light of the South China Sea disputes using the recently trending "Nothing beats a Jet2 Holiday" meme. Supporters of Duterte reacted negatively, with calls to boycott endorsements of Vice Ganda including McDonald's. Representative Leila de Lima posted a picture of herself with McDonald's breakfast a few days later, referencing the meme.

=== September 21 ===
Duterte supporters gathered at Liwasang Bonifacio, amid the flood control projects scandal in the Philippines, carrying Philippine flags with "Marcos Resign" protest signs. They calling for the resignation of President Bongbong Marcos, and headed to Mendiola, intending to move their rally to nearby Malacañang Palace, but halted their march due to the rioters from Baha sa Luneta along Recto. At EDSA, tense scene unfolded at the Trillion Peso March on EDSA when supporters of former president Rodrigo Duterte and Vice President Sara Duterte clashed with the anti-corruption protesters.

=== November 17 ===
The Duterte-aligned groups, Reforma Filipina and Hakbang ng Maisug, said they respected the decision of INC organizers and instead moved their assembly to Liwasang Bonifacio, where they continued to rally over separate issues including flooding in Quezon City’s fifth district.

== See also ==
- Protests against Rodrigo Duterte
- Protests against Bongbong Marcos
