= Impact of the COVID-19 pandemic on the Catholic Church =

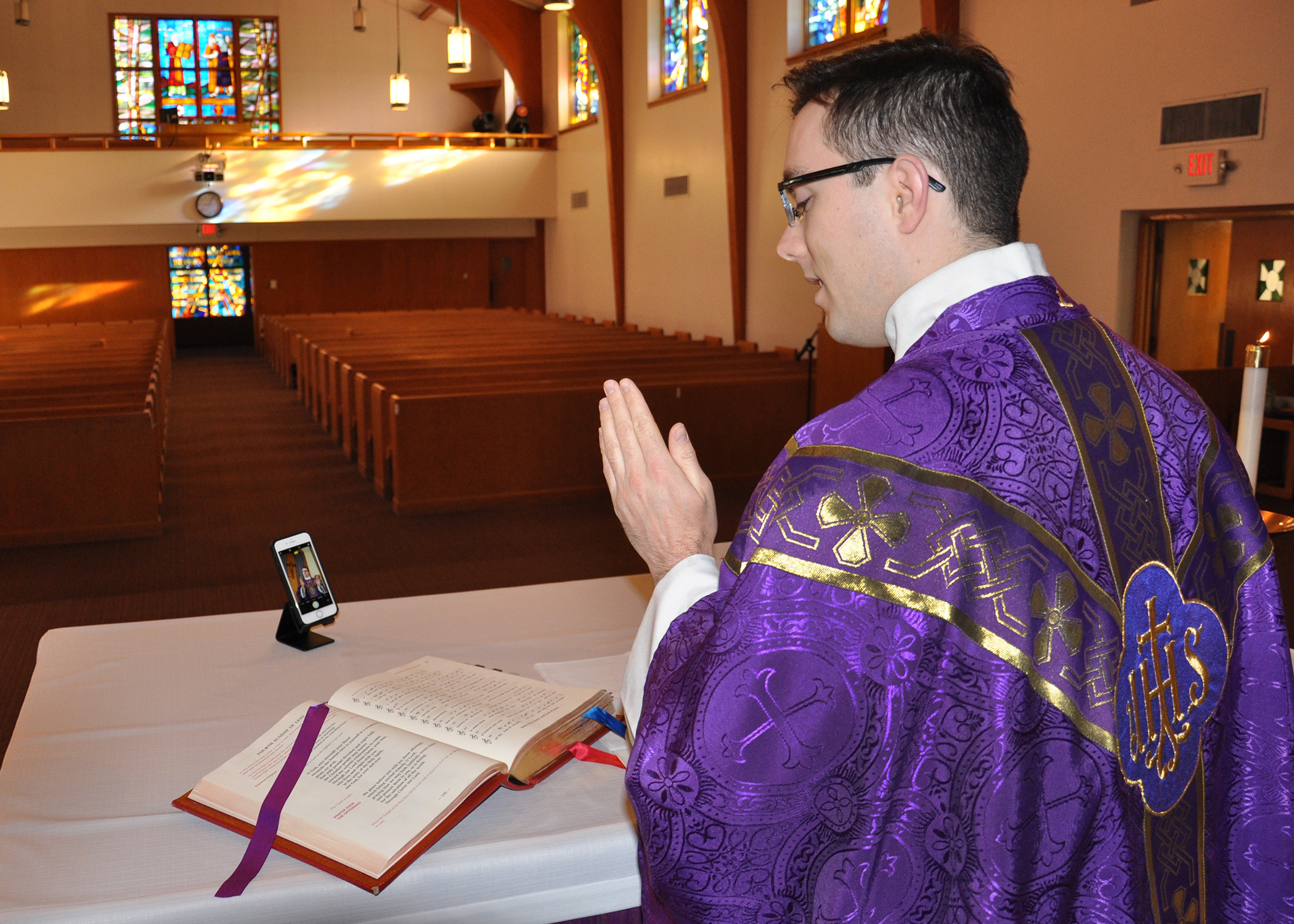
An American military chaplain prepares for a live-streamed liturgy in an empty chapel at Offutt Air Force Base in March 2020

The COVID-19 pandemic that started in 2020 and ended in May 2023 significantly impacted liturgical celebrations of the Catholic Church worldwide. The Pontifical Foundation Aid to the Church in Need (ACN) stated that the pandemic was not "just a medical, social and economic problem, but also a pastoral problem", which led ACN to start encouraging a special program for the actions of priests and religious against the virus spread.

== Public masses ==
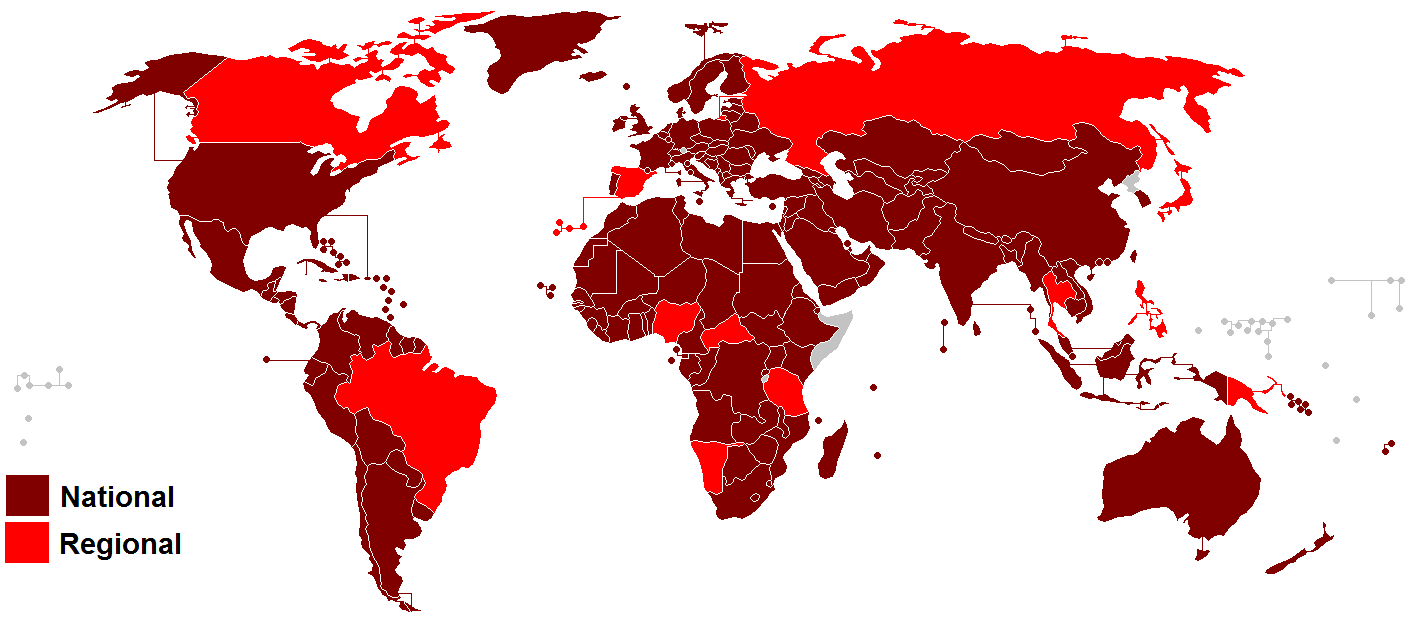
Countries where there were suspensions of Catholic Masses with the presence of the people during the COVID-19 pandemics, at regional level (in red) or national level (in burgundy).

In March 2020, all public Masses were suspended in Vatican City and Italy due to the COVID-19 pandemic. These suspensions began in late-February in the Archdioceses of Milan and Venice and were extended to the rest of the Italian peninsula on 8 March. Setting an example for churches unable to celebrate public Masses due to the lockdown, Pope Francis began livestreaming daily Mass from his residence at Domus Sanctae Marthae on 9 March. Outside Italy, Mass in cities around the world were suspended in the days that followed. At the height of the outbreak in Italy, on 27 March, Pope Francis imparted the Urbi et Orbi blessing, normally reserved for Christmas and Easter, from an empty Saint Peter's Square following a prayer for the health of all the world. For the prayer service, Francis brought the crucifix from San Marcello al Corso which had processed through the streets of Rome during the miraculous plague cure of 1522. The prayer service concluded with Benediction of the Blessed Sacrament, as church bells were rung and sirens blared across Rome. The spread of COVID-19 soon slowed in Italy, and public Masses were allowed to resume on 18 May, with Pope Francis celebrating his last daily live-stream Mass and first public Mass since the lockdown on the centenary of the birth of Pope John Paul II.

All over the world, many churches suspended the presence of the faithful in their Masses, and resorted to virtual services for broadcasting the celebrations, such as live streaming or other ones, like television and radio. The Vatican announced that the Holy Week celebrations in Rome, which take place at the end of Lent would be canceled. Some dioceses ordered their churches to be closed to the public, while other dioceses such as the Archdiocese of New York canceled Masses but kept churches open for prayer. In Spain, many cities canceled their Holy Week festivities. Holy Week is usually celebrated with parades and significant collections with tourism; in Seville, it was the first time that events were canceled since 1933. Due to the interruption of several Catholic religious activities (if not their totality), Pope Francis greatly encouraged the prayer of the Holy Rosary.

== Commentary on vaccine ==
On 26 February 2021, the Archdiocese of New Orleans issued a statement calling the Janssen COVID-19 vaccine "morally compromised," as it uses an abortion-derived cell line in vaccine production. According to The Washington Post, the Catholic Church embraced COVID-19 vaccines, and "Catholic religious leaders across the United States are supporting coronavirus vaccination". On 10 January 2022, Pope Francis issued a statement on COVID-19 vaccines. He stated that COVID-19 vaccination was a "moral obligation" and denounced "how people had been swayed by 'baseless information' to refuse one of the most effective measures to save lives".

== Impact on finances ==
The 2020 fiscal report for the Vatican showed a decrease in revenue of about 50%, but the Institute for the Works of Religion contributed more income. Expenses were reduced by $3.88 million. The Vatican also planned to increase their liquid capital in response to market uncertainty to avoid selling Church assets in unfavorable market conditions.
