= Quirino Grandstand =

Grandstand in Manila, Philippines

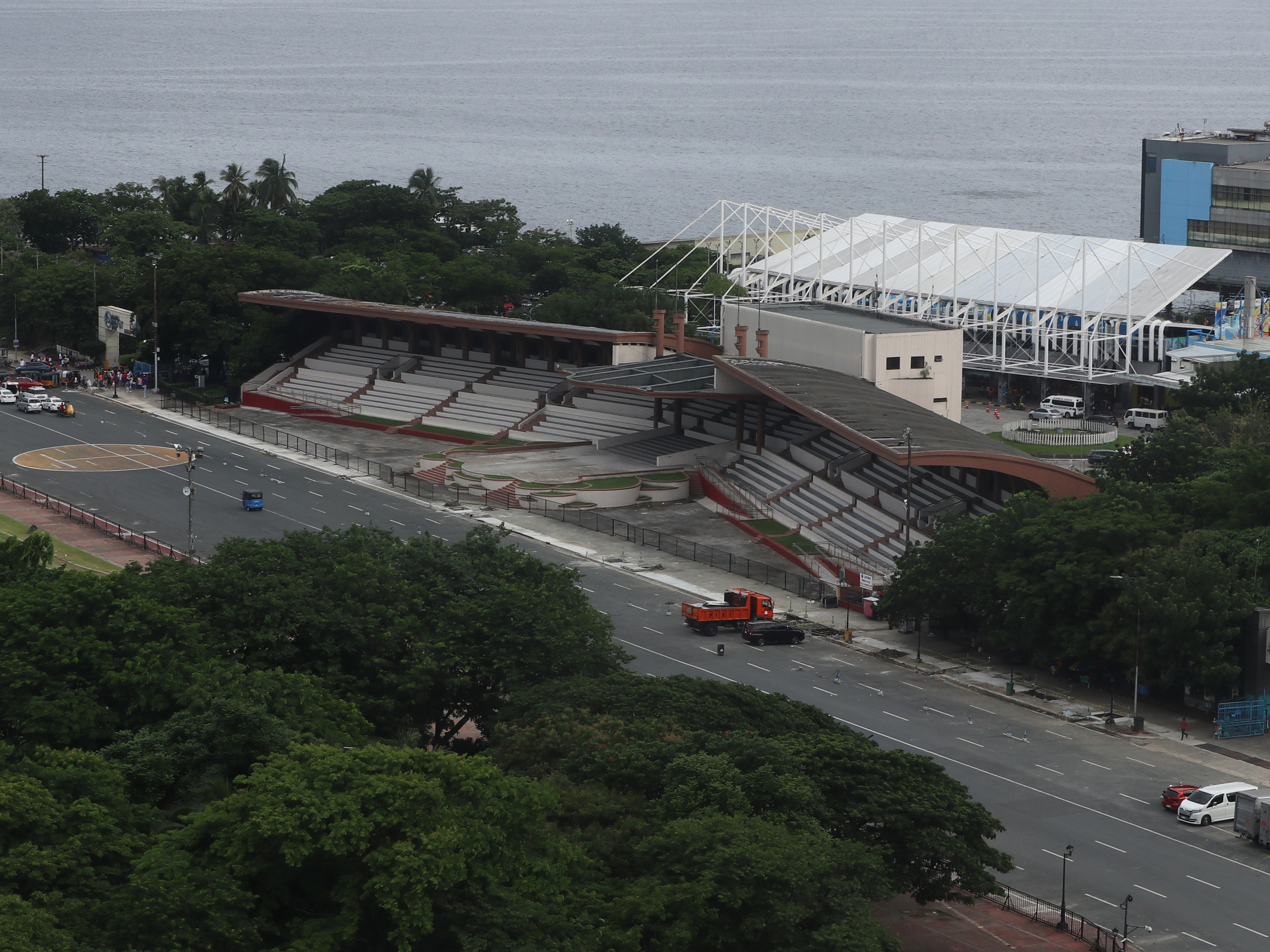

- Location within Manila
- Interactive map of Quirino Grandstand
- Former names: Independence Grandstand
- Location: Independence Road, Rizal Park, Ermita, Manila, Philippines
- Coordinates: 14°34′48″N 120°58′26″E
- Capacity: 10,000
- Record attendance: 6,000 (2015 Papal Mass)

Construction
- Built: 1946
- Renovated: 1949
- Architects: Juan Arellano; Federico Ilustre

Tenants
- World Youth Day 1995; 2005 Southeast Asian Games; Papal Visit Concluding Mass 2015; National Rally for Peace

The Quirino Grandstand, formerly known as the Independence Grandstand, is a grandstand located at Rizal Park, Manila, Philippines.

== History ==
Contrary to popular belief, the first Independence Grandstand was not originally located on the present site of the Quirino Grandstand but on the area close to Dewey Boulevard right across the Rizal Monument and the flagpole. It was completed in 1946 for the ceremony of the declaration of Philippine independence from the United States on July 4, 1946. Juan Arellano designed the original grandstand in the neoclassical design with ornate elements added to the structure such as a triumphal arch at the top with two "wings" that shaded the main galleries, a stage in the form of a ship's bow with a carved figurehead of a maiden representing freedom, and two other figures, representing a Filipino and a Filipina, that stood about 10 meters (33 ft) tall behind the stage and the central gallery.

=== The current grandstand ===
The grandstand was later demolished and a new one was built further away from the old site towards near the breakwater and Manila Bay where it stands to this day. Designed by Federico Ilustre, supervising architect for the Bureau of Public Works, the new Independence Grandstand's design was patterned after the Arellano-designed grandstand, (including the triumphal arch) with a simpler design (without the ship bow stage and the statues) and some Art Deco influence in the canopy compared to the original. The structure was completed in 1949, in time for the inauguration of President Elpidio Quirino. Years later after his death, the grandstand was renamed in his honor.

Quirino Grandstand was expanded over the years to accommodate more people, and the triumphal arch was eventually gone. Work in the 1990s brought about a return to the structure's neoclassical roots with the addition of some neoclassical elements in the expansion area.

== Notable events ==
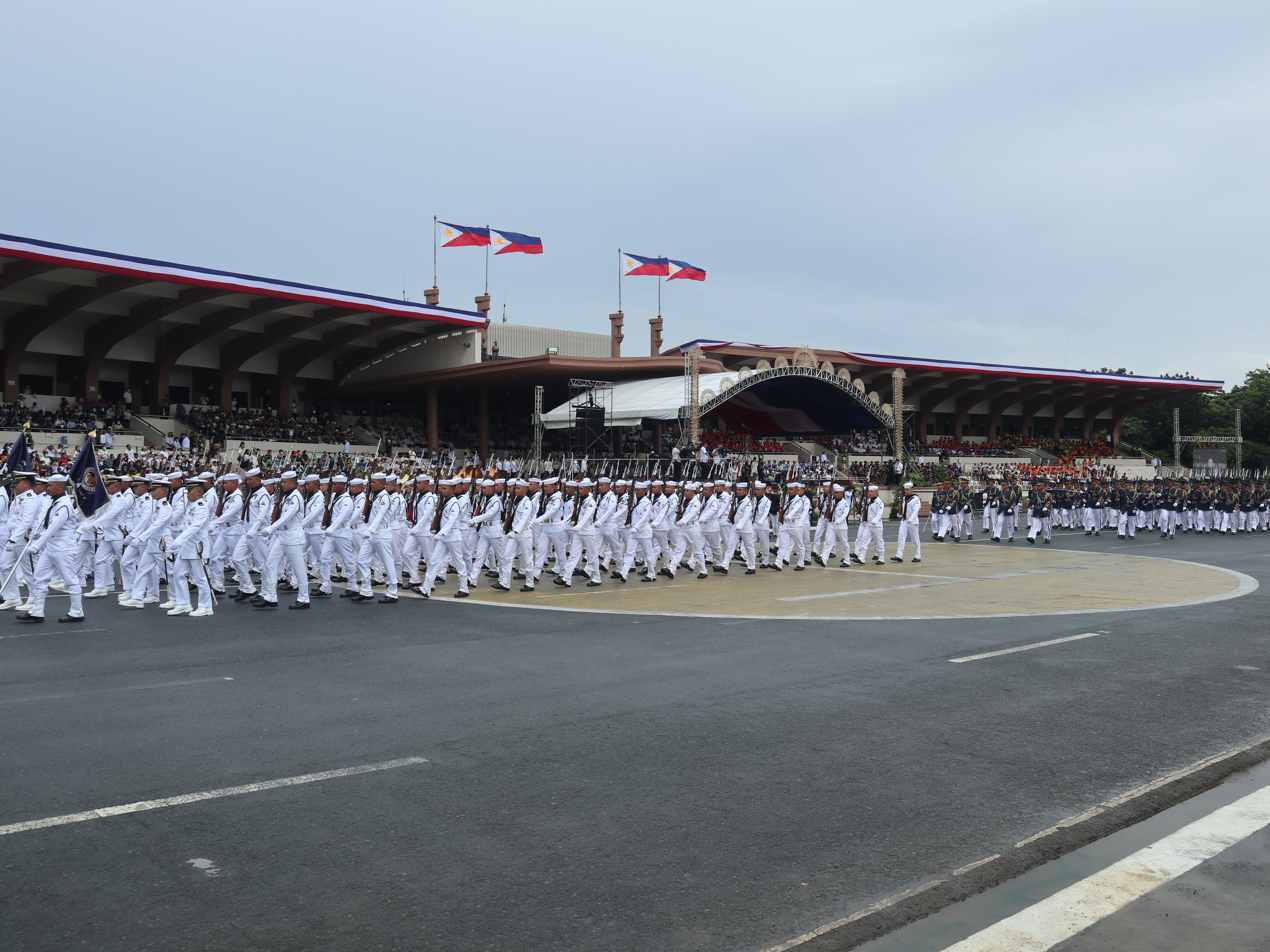
Quirino Grandstand during the 2023 Independence Day rites.

The Quirino Grandstand has been the traditional venue for annual Independence Day activities as well as that of many Philippine presidential inaugurations since the 1949 Quirino inaugural. In addition, the grandstand has also been a site for many civic, religious, sporting, and political gatherings. It served as the main venue of the World Youth Day 1995 closing liturgy, the 2000 Millennium celebrations in the country, the 2005 Southeast Asian Games opening and closing ceremonies, and the concluding Mass of Pope Francis's visit to the Philippines in 2015. It is also used yearly for Jesus Is Lord Church Worldwide's anniversaries since 1989. It was also the main venue of El Shaddai (movement) during its early years and yearly used during their anniversaries from 1988, 1993–1994, 1998–2001, 2003–2009 and 2023–present

Since 2006, the January 9 Traslación of the replica of Black Nazarene starts at the Grandstand.

SOP held a special episode celebrating GMA Network's ratings victory at the grandstand on October 10, 2004. Eight years later, on January 22, 2012, ASAP of the rival TV network ABS-CBN also held a special episode at the grandstand to celebrate Chinese New Year.

The grandstand grounds were also the site of the 2010 Manila hostage crisis, which strained relations between Manila and Hong Kong for a time.

From 2020 to 2022, during the COVID-19 pandemic, the grandstand was made as a make-shift drive-thru COVID-19 testing facility and later as a drive-thru vaccination site by the Manila city government.

In 2024, the launch of the Bagong Pilipinas political movement took place in a venue where 3,100 attendees, including members of Congress, government employees, heads of government agencies, and P30K club members, were present.

In February 2025, the grandstand hosted the first Waterbomb festival in the Philippines, featuring many K-pop personalities.

== Gallery ==
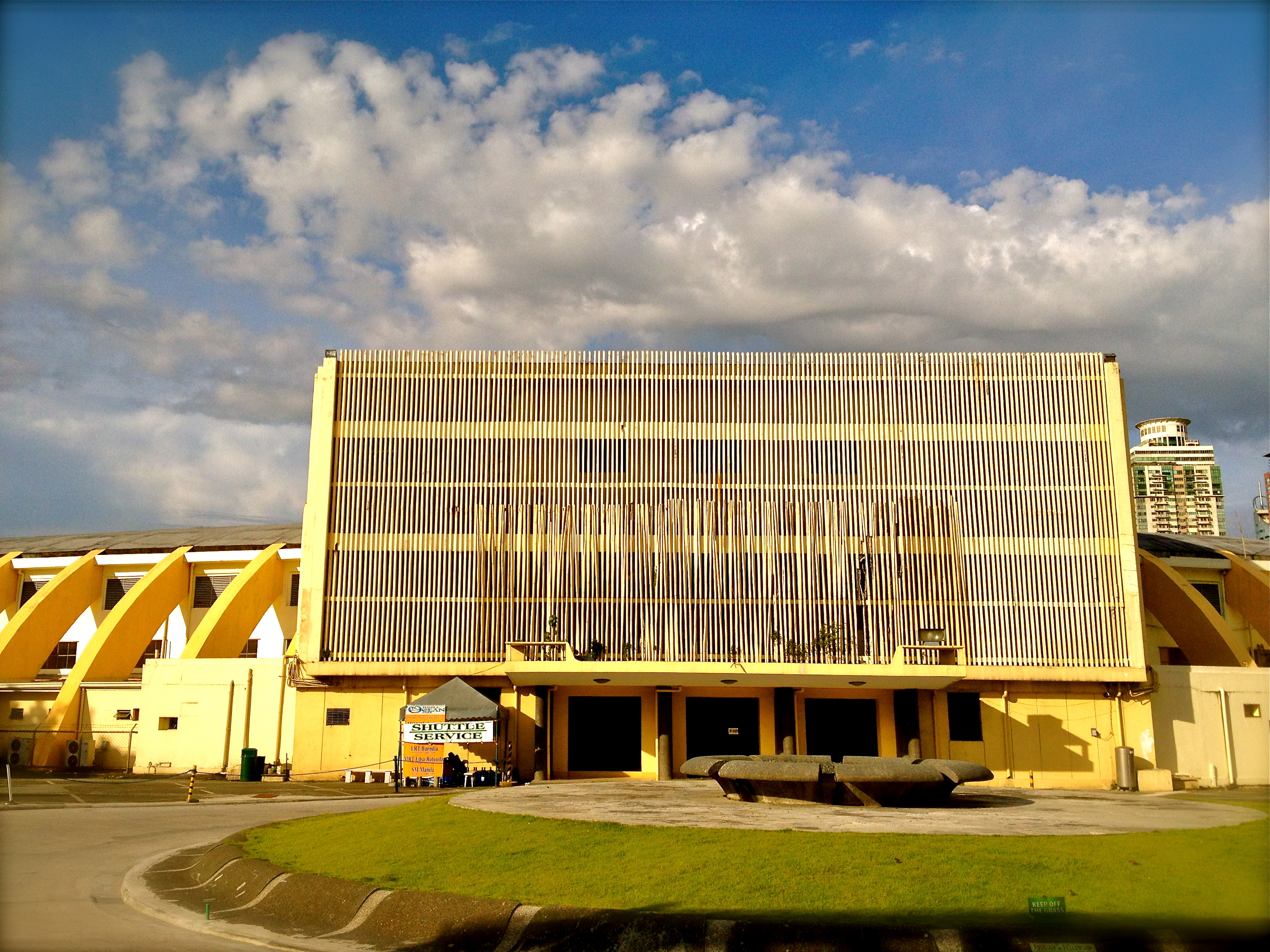
Back of Quirino Grandstand

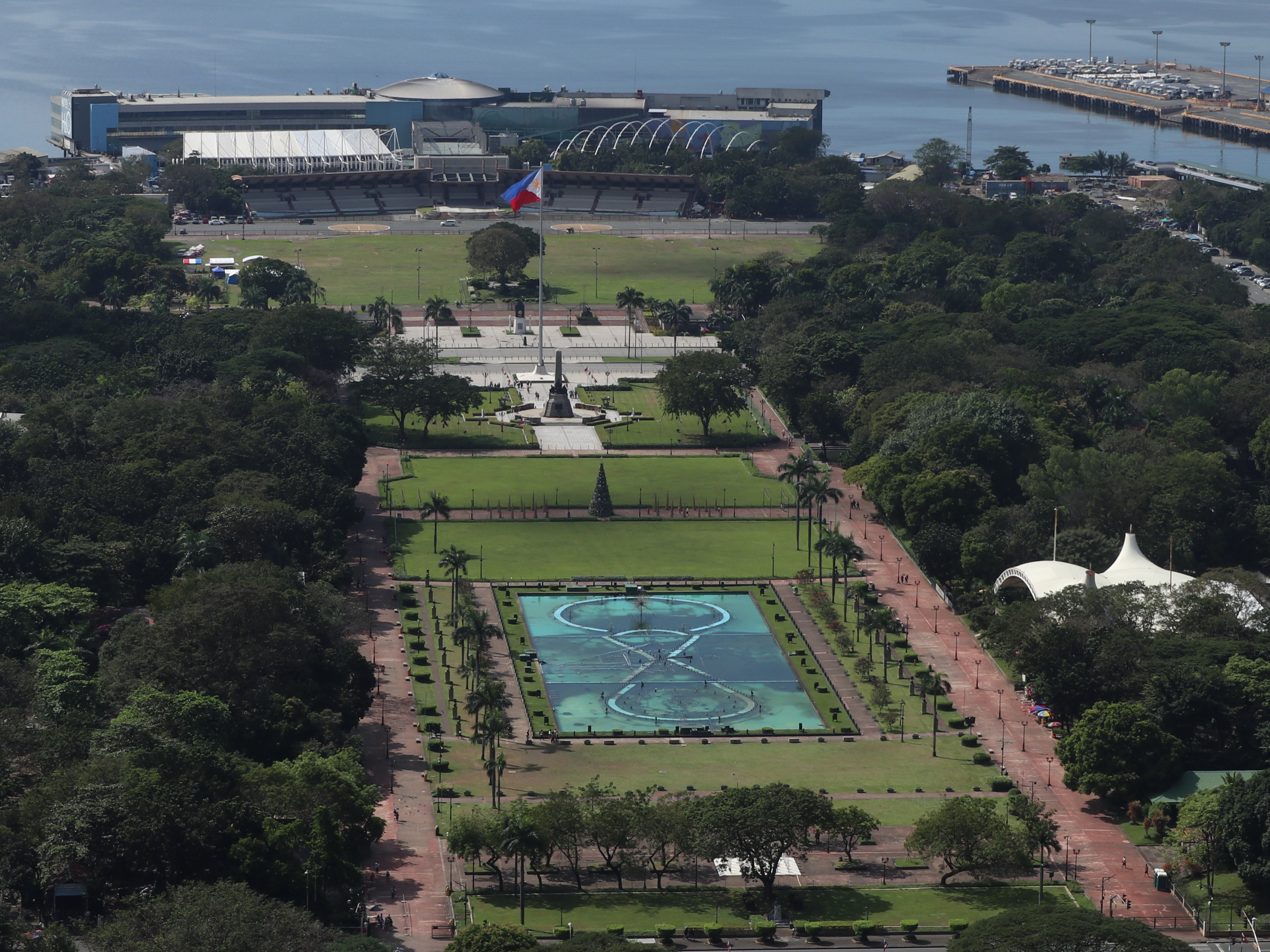
Aerial view of the grandstand, showing the open field fronting it and the rest of Rizal Park on the other side of Roxas Boulevard

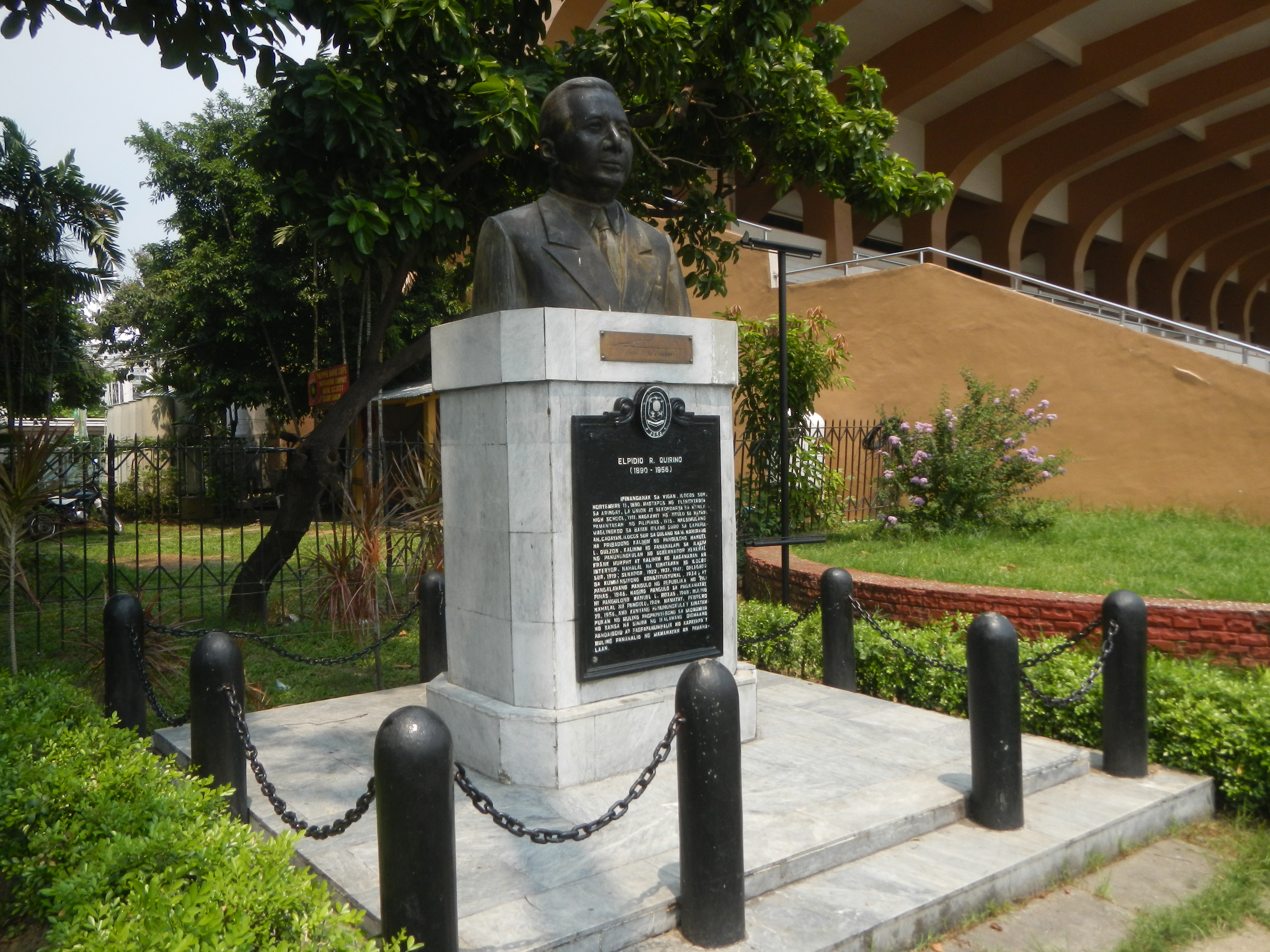
Bust of Elpidio Quirino next to the grandstand
