= Central Terminal (LRT) =

Train station in Manila, Philippines

Coordinates: 14°35′34.45″N 120°58′53.84″E

Central Terminal	GL13
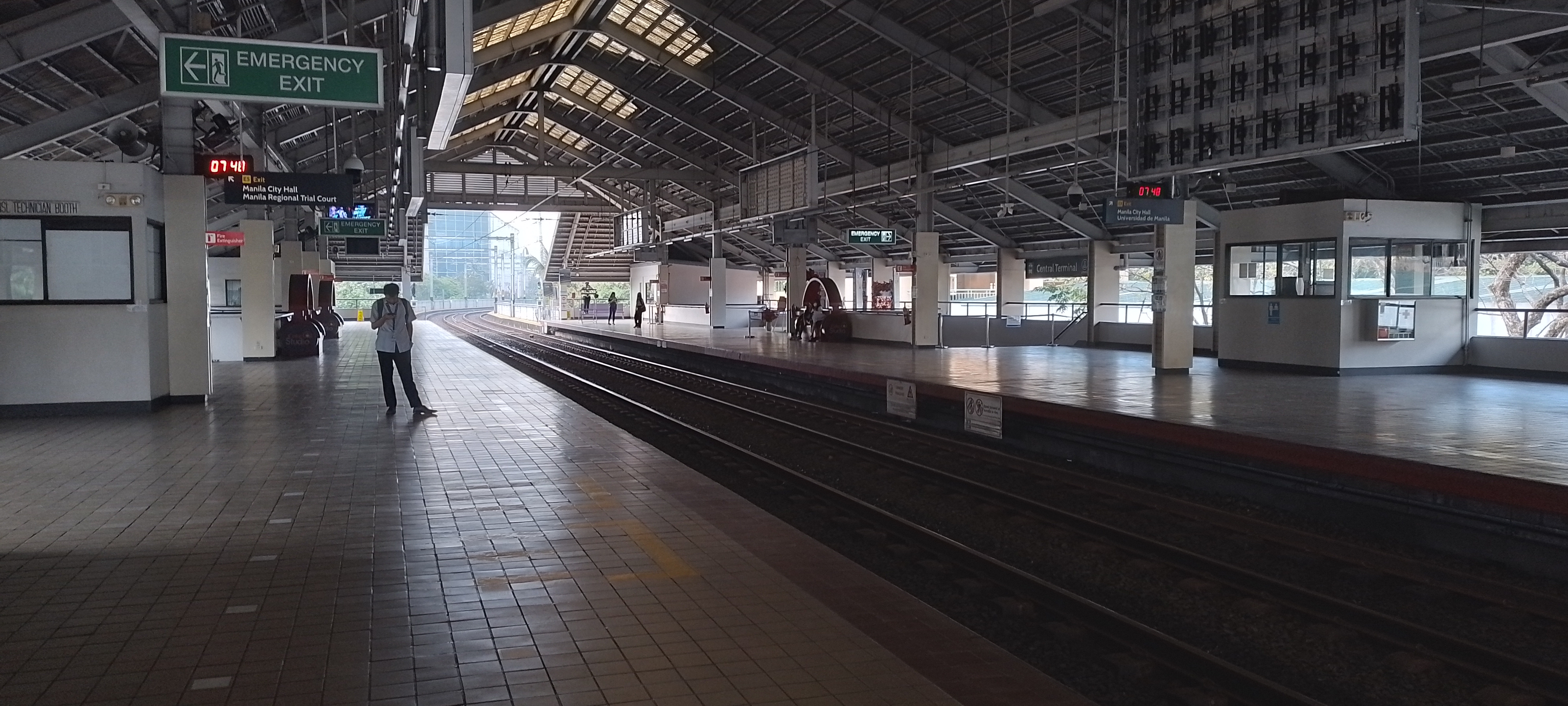
- The platform of the station

General information
- Other names: Arroceros; Lawton
- Location: Antonio Villegas Street, Ermita, Manila, Metro Manila, Philippines
- Owner: Department of Transportation; Light Rail Manila Corporation
- Line: LRT Line 1
- Platforms: 2 (2 side)
- Tracks: 2
- Connections: Lawton Park N' Ride; Manila Multimodal Terminal; Lawton Ferry Station

Construction
- Structure type: Elevated
- Parking: Yes (Lawton Park N' Ride, UDM, Bonifacio Shrine, SM City Manila)
- Cycle facilities: Bicycle racks

History
- Opened: December 1, 1984; 41 years ago

Services
Preceding station	Manila LRT	Following station
Carriedo towards Fernando Poe Jr.	LRT Line 1	United Nations towards Dr. Santos
Track layout
Location
- Location within Manila Location within Metro Manila Location within Luzon Location within Philippines

Central Terminal, formerly and widely known as Arroceros station, is an elevated Light Rail Transit (LRT) station located on the LRT Line 1 (LRT-1) system in Ermita, Manila. A popular name for the station is Arroceros due to its proximity to the Arroceros Forest Park; Arroceros is also the former name of Antonio Villegas Street, where the station is located.

Central Terminal is the last station of LRT-1 south of the Pasig River and serves as the fourteenth station for trains headed to Fernando Poe Jr. and the twelfth station for trains headed to Dr. Santos. The station was named as such due to its initial central location in the line, having been the tenth station for trains headed to both Monumento and Baclaran, the line's former termini prior to the addition of the North and Cavite Extensions. Opened on December 1, 1984, as part of the line's initial section known as Taft Line (after Taft Avenue, where most of the section's stations are located), it was the line's initial northern terminus, known as Arroceros, until Carriedo was opened on April 14, 1985.

Located in Manila's University Belt, the station is near educational institutions such as the Colegio de San Juan de Letran, the Philippine Normal University, the city-owned Pamantasan ng Lungsod ng Maynila, the Mapúa University, and the Lyceum of the Philippines University. All these institutions, except the Philippine Normal University, lie within the former Spanish walled city of Intramuros. It is also near some of Manila's major landmarks, such as the Mehan Gardens and the Manila Metropolitan Theater. It is also near the Manila City Hall, Liwasang Bonifacio, Manila Central Post Office, Manila Hall of Justice, Bonifacio Shrine, and the National Museum of Fine Arts. SM City Manila is also a nearby shopping center.

== Transportation links ==
As its name indicates, Central Terminal is a major transportation hub for LRT-1 commuters. Next to the station is the Lawton bus terminal, also known as Lawton Park N' Ride, which is served by intercity and intracity buses, jeepneys, and UV Express vehicles. The Manila Multimodal Terminal by the Pasig River is also located near the station. Taxis also serve the vicinity of the station and of the bus terminal. The Lawton station of the Pasig River Ferry Service is also located nearby.

== Station layout ==
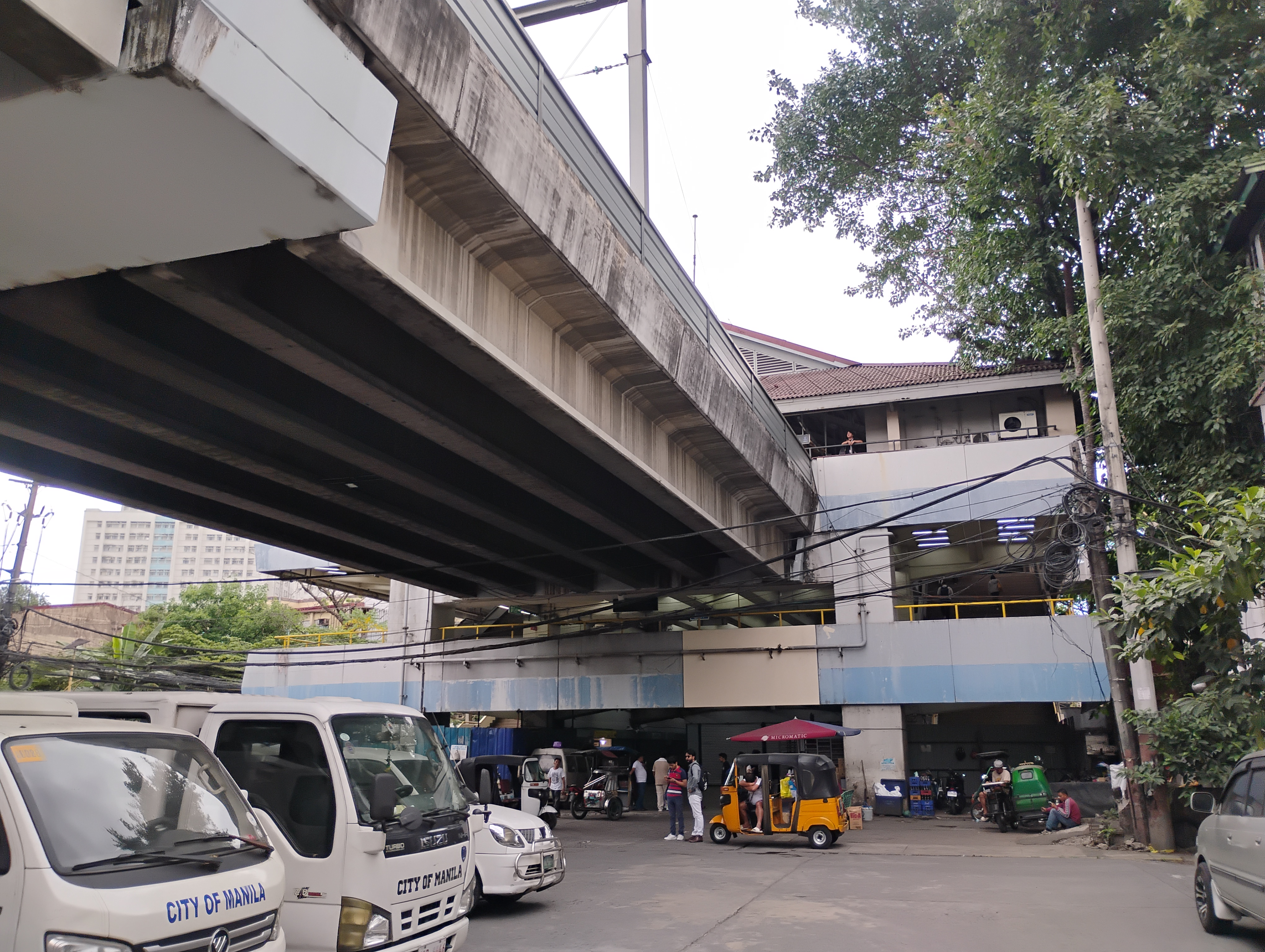
Central Terminal from street level

=== Street level ===
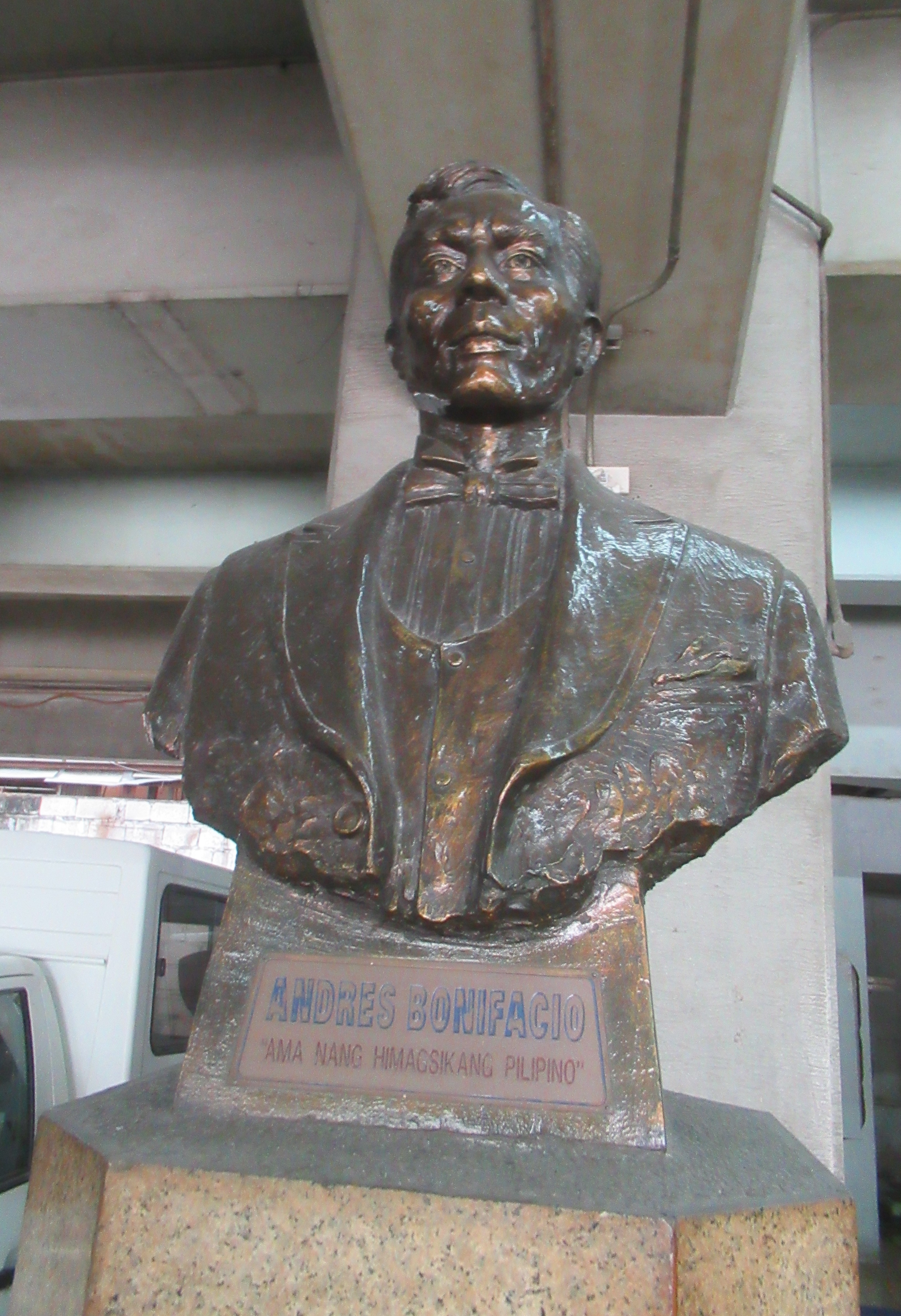
Bust of Andres Bonifacio at the station's ground level

Central Terminal has a unique layout as the only station on the line with separate street-level exits that bypass the station concourse, which are located on all of its four corners. Access to the station concourse is provided by two large staircases, in which only one is normally in use. Each of the four corner exits on the street level have one-way revolving doors to prevent counterflow entry through these exits.

The street level of the station has multiple shops, stalls, and some street vendors.

=== Station concourse ===
The concourse of the station is much wider than most stations on the LRT-1 mainline, allowing space for more ticket offices and fare gates. Some of the operations offices are also located at the concourse, as well as a restroom.

=== Platform level ===
Each platform of the station has two entrances and two exits. The middle-north and middle-south staircases of each platform provides direct exit access to the street level, while the north staircases on each platform serve as both the entrance and exit of each platform to the station concourse. The south staircases on both platforms are currently not in use. A clinic is located on the south end of the northbound platform.

=== Nearby buildings ===
The northern and middle exits provide access to the Arroceros Forest Park, Lawton Park 'N Ride, Lawton Bus Terminal, the Manila Metropolitan Theater, and the Mehan Gardens. Commuters going to Intramuros and the Port Area are usually advised to take the Lawton underpass at the Lawton Bus Terminal.

The middle exit provides access to the Metropolitan Trial Court, Maynilad Water Services, Civil Service Commission, and Manila Youth Reception Center.

The southern exits provide access to the Manila City Hall, Universidad de Manila, Office of the Ombudsman, Bonifacio Park, Philippine Normal University, Adamson University, National Museum of the Philippines, and SM City Manila.

== See also ==
- List of rail transit stations in Metro Manila
- Manila Light Rail Transit System
- Media related to Central Terminal station at Wikimedia Commons
