= Universidad de Manila =

Public university in Manila, Philippines

- Former name: City College of Manila (1995–2006)
- Motto: Public service through quality education
- Type: Public, City university
- Established: April 26, 1995; 31 years ago
- Chairman: Mayor Isko Moreno Domagoso
- President: Felma Carlos-Tria
- Undergraduates: 14,000+
- Postgraduates: 200
- Location: Main Campus: One Mehan Gardens, Ermita, Manila, Metro Manila, Philippines; Henry Sy Sr. Campus: Carlos Palanca Sr. Street, Santa Cruz, Manila, Metro Manila, Philippines; 14°35′31″N 120°58′53″E
- Campus: Urban
- Alma Mater song: UDM Hymn
- Colors: Green Gold White
- Nicknames: UDMian, Merlions
- Website: www.udm.edu.ph

- Location in Manila Location in Metro Manila Location in Luzon Location in the Philippines

Universidad de Manila, also referred to by its acronym UdM, is a public coeducational city government funded higher education institution in Manila, Philippines. It was founded on April 26, 1995 with the approval by Mayor Alfredo Lim of Manila City Ordinance (MCO) No. 7885 “An Ordinance Authorizing the City Government of Manila to Establish and Operate the Dalubhasaan ng Lungsod ng Maynila (City College of Manila)". It offers both academic and technical-vocational courses and programs.

Its Main Campus is located at the grounds of Mehan Gardens, Ermita in front of the Bonifacio Shrine (Kartilya ng Katipunan) and beside the Central Terminal station of LRT Line 1. It has a satellite Campus (UDM Annex) along Carlos Palanca Street in Santa Cruz.

== History ==
The logo of City College of Manila (CCM)

On 26 April 1995, Manila City Ordinance (MCO) No. 7885 entitled “An Ordinance Authorizing the City Government of Manila to Establish and Operate the Dalubhasaan ng Lungsod ng Maynila (City College of Manila) and for such other purposes” was approved by Mayor Alfredo Lim. Its principal sponsors were Manila Councilors Nestor Ponce Jr., Humberto Basco and Bernardito Ang. The then-City College of Manila (CCM) was originally located at the 15-storey Old Philippine National Bank Building in Escolta Street, Binondo.

In 2001, Manila mayor Lito Atienza announced that the campus would be moved to Mehan Garden. Several alternative sites in Manila were proposed, such as the site of the Ateneo Municipal in Intramuros or the former site of Avanceña High School in Tanduay, Quiapo.

On 26 June 2006, Mayor Lito Atienza approved MCO No. 8120 which renamed the City College of Manila to Universidad de Manila. UdM was also transferred from Binondo to its current location at Cecilia Muñoz Street corner Antonio J. Villegas Street, Mehan Gardens, Ermita.

On its 25th founding anniversary, Universidad de Manila was granted fiscal autonomy by virtue of MCO No. 8635. This ordinance was approved by Mayor Francisco “Isko Moreno” Domagoso on 27 April 2020 and it states that “the University shall be treated as an independent and institutional department of the City of Manila wherein the management of fiscal, human resources, and all other assets shall be within its control.”

The Downtown Campus was later renamed to Henry Sy Sr. Campus, after the Filipino-Chinese businessman Henry Sy. Its CMIT Building was renovated and turned over on 22 March 2022.

The Tondo Campus is a P400-million extension with 48 classrooms, 15 multifunction rooms and a gymnasium. In October 2024, Mayor Honey Lacuna and Felma Carlos-Tria led the time capsule lowering and groundbreaking of UdM 's 10-storey school building in a 1,500-square-meter lot at Vitas Skate Park.

On November 12, 2026, Universidad de Manila acquired eight adjoining properties along Recto Avenue from the Land Bank of the Philippines worth P975 million, with full operations targeted for 2028.

== Gallery ==
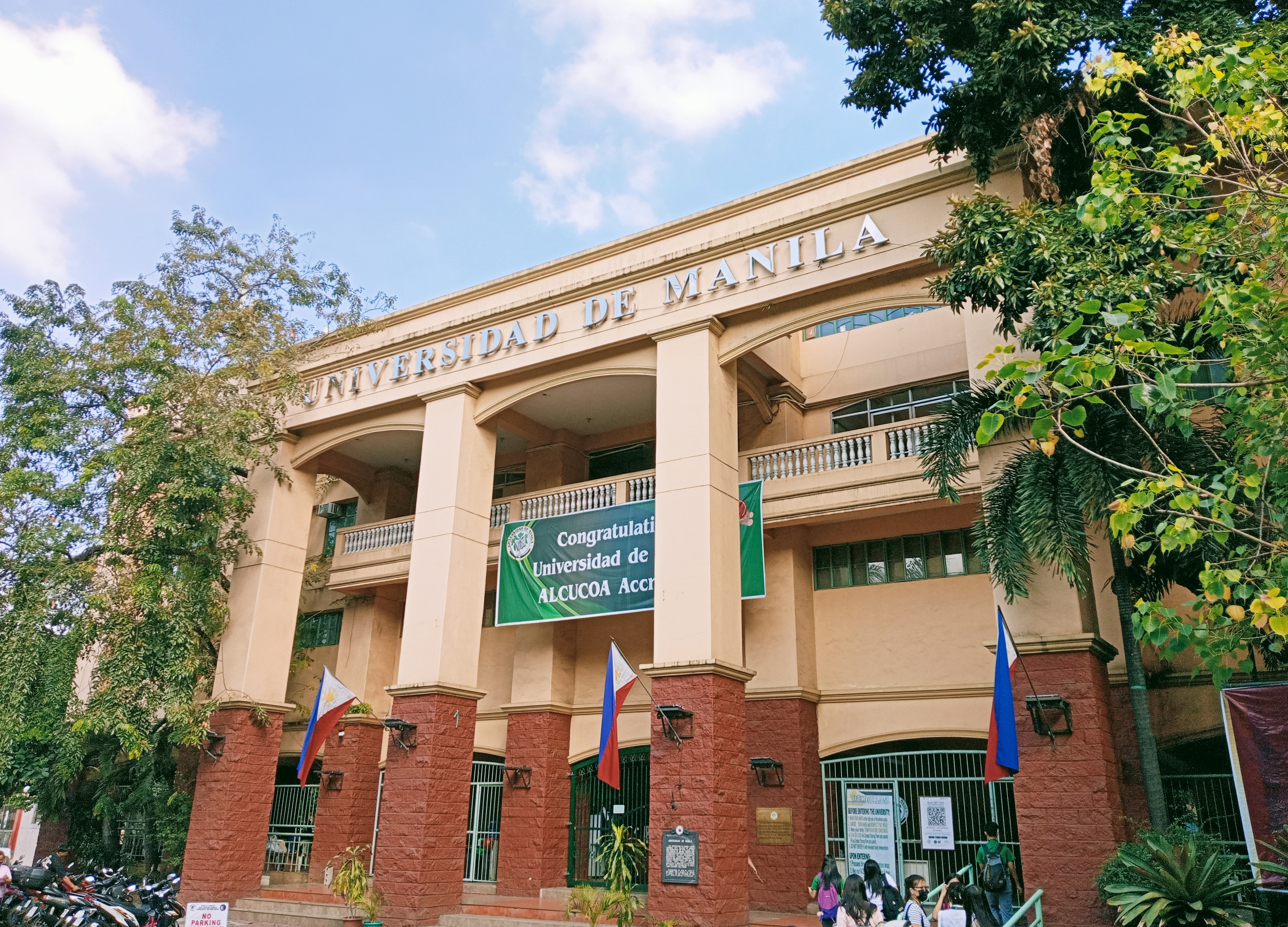
UDM at Day

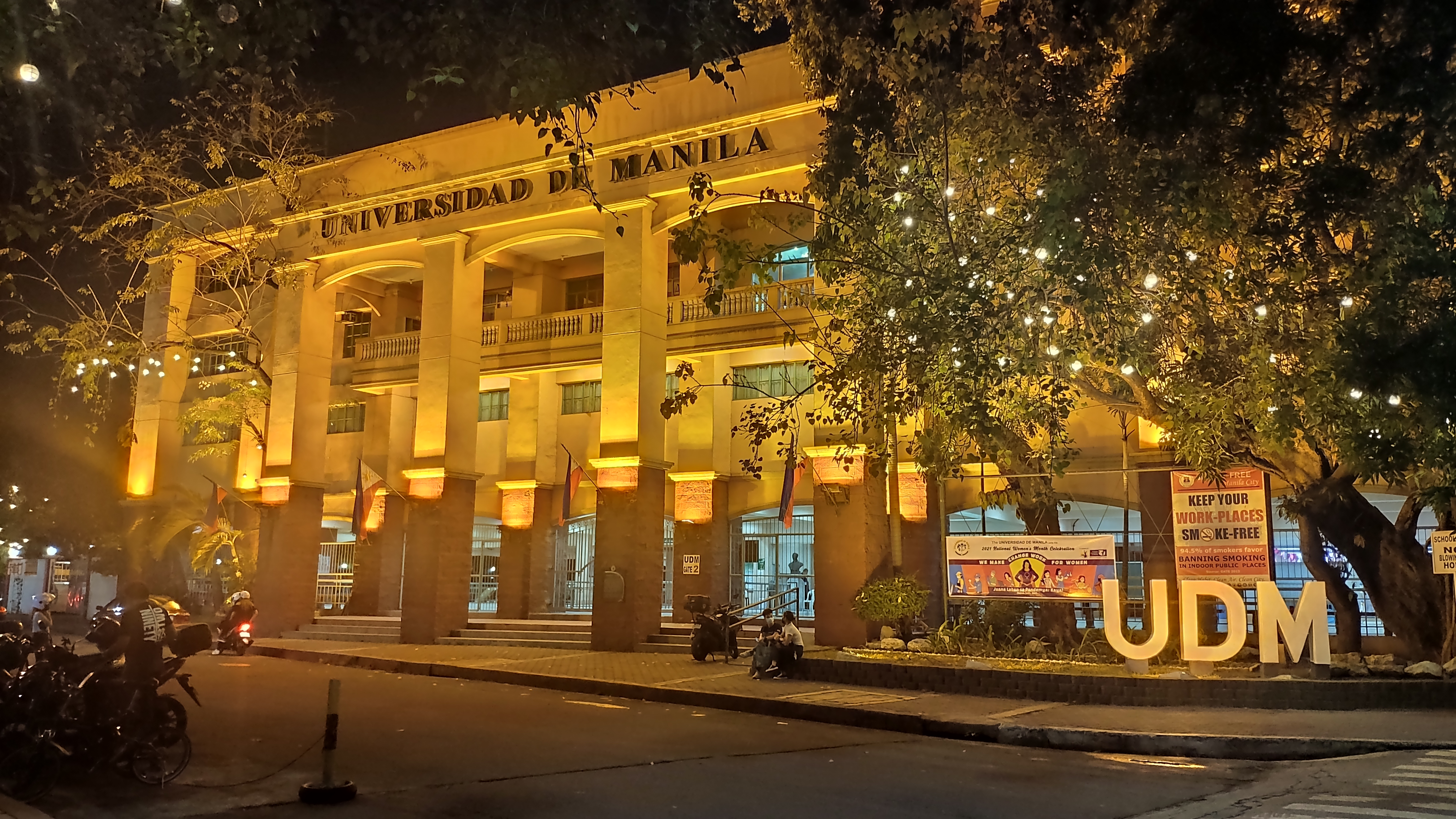
UDM at Night

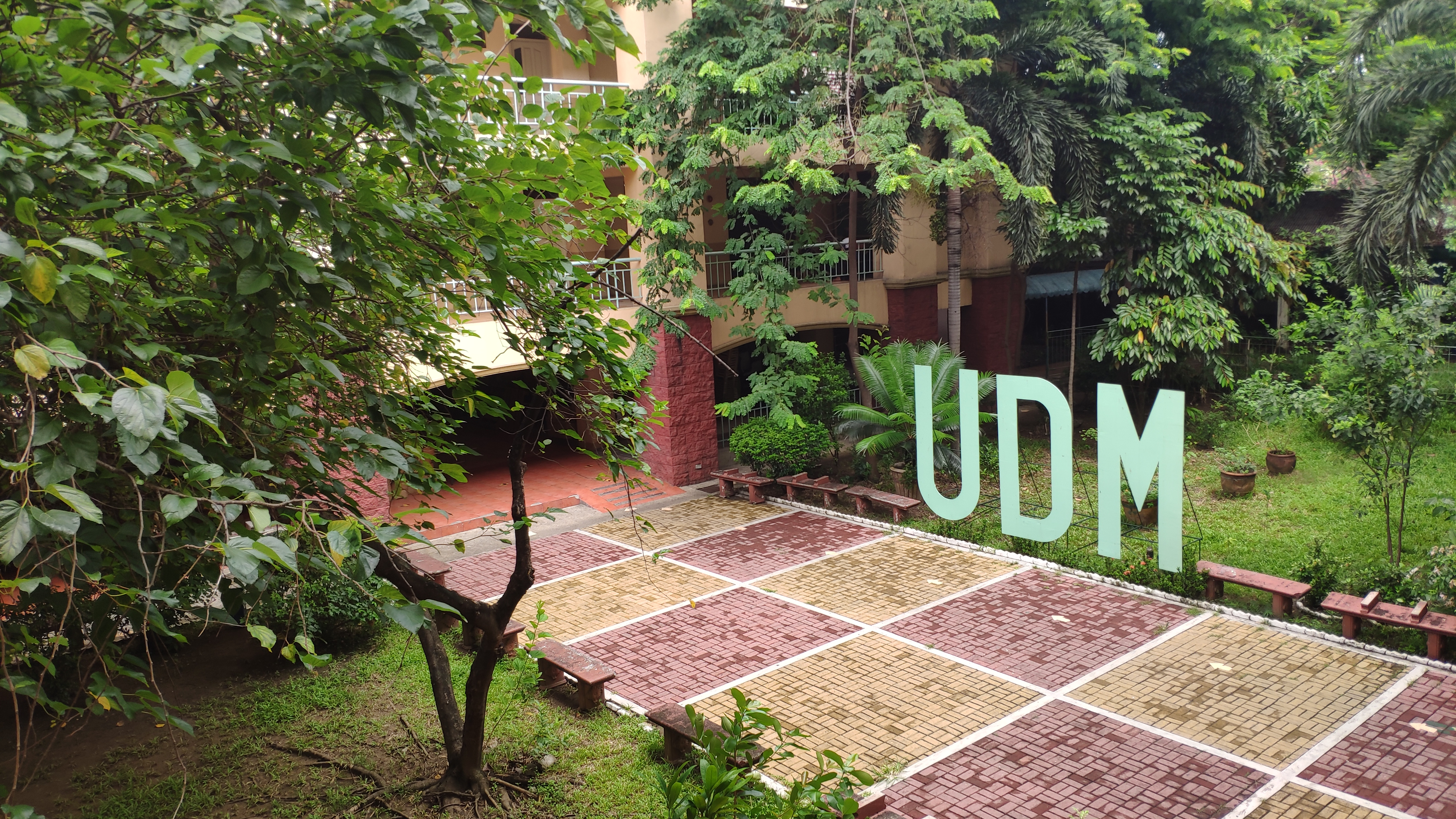
UDM Garden

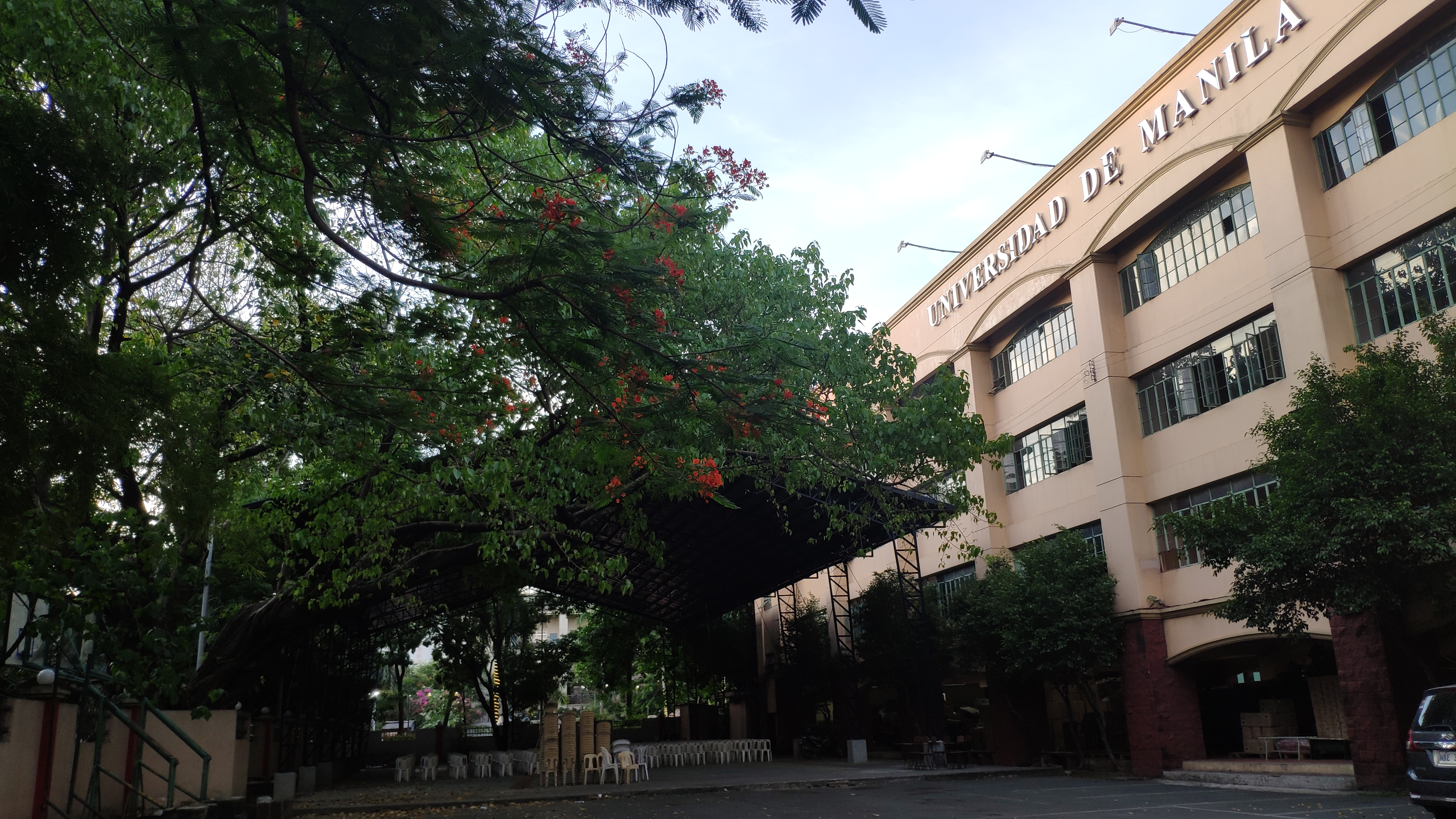
UDM Courtside

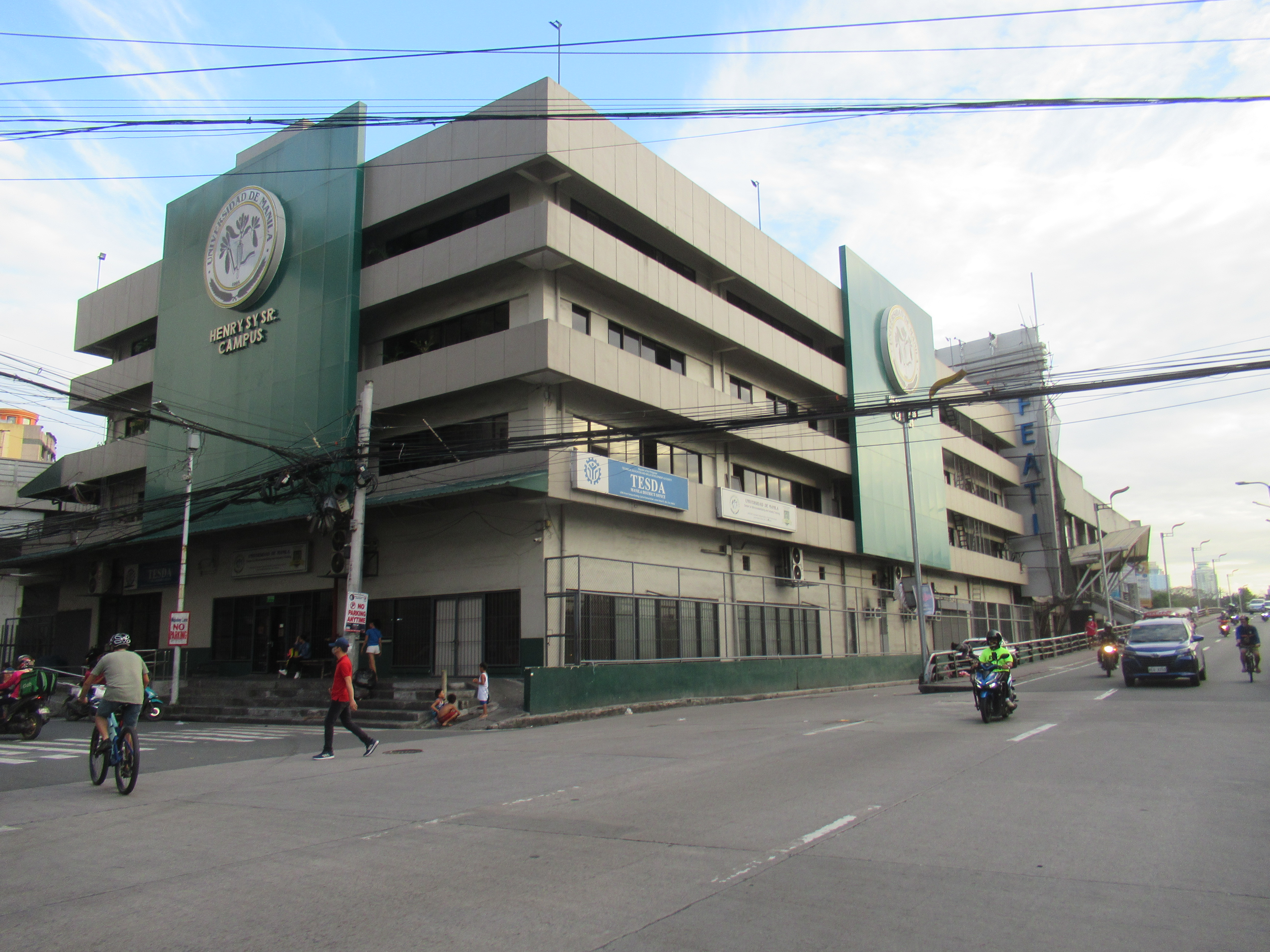
UDM Henry Sy Sr. Campus in Santa Cruz
