= Mehan Garden =

Public park in Manila, Philippines

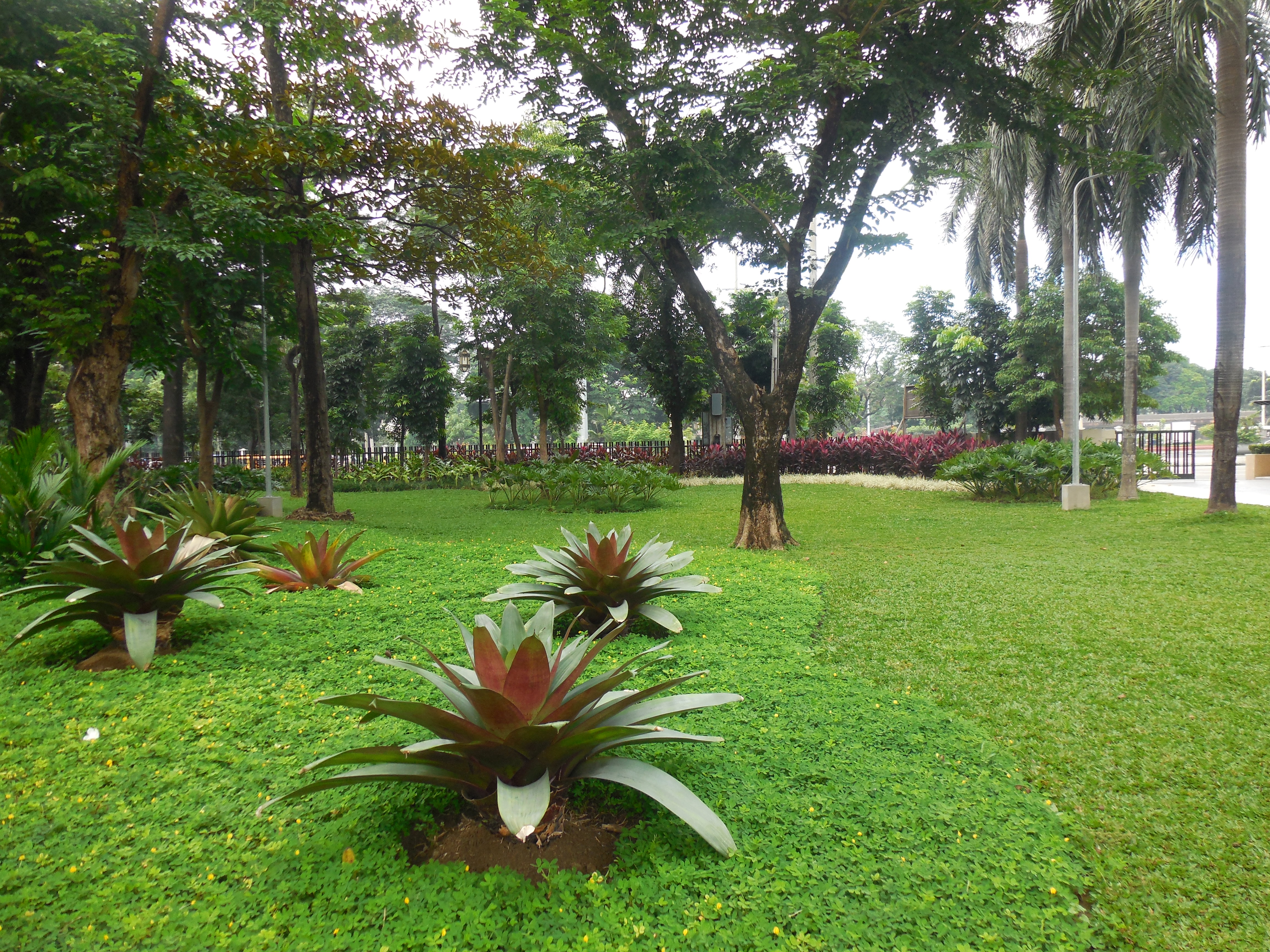
- Mehan Garden

- Location within Manila
- Type: Urban Park
- Location: Ermita, Manila, Philippines
- Coordinates: 14°35′33″N 120°58′50″E
- Area: 2.8 hectares (6.9 acres)
- Created: 1858
- Operator: Manila City Government
- Public transit: Central Terminal

Mehan Garden is an open space in Manila, Philippines. It was established in 1858 by the Spanish colonial authorities as a botanical garden, called the Jardín Botánico, outside the walled city of Intramuros. It was then converted to a public park in 1913, although it eventually deteriorated. Mehan Garden was renovated and reopened as a public park several times.

== History ==
=== Pre-colonial and Spanish period ===
The site of Mehan Garden was the fifth and seventh Parián, (Note: The location of the Parián moved several times during the Spanish period. The fifth and seventh Parián was respectively established in 1583-1639 and 1645-1792.) which consisted of residential quarters and a market for the Chinese in Manila. The site was surrounded by the Pasig River in the northeast and the moat of Intramuros in the southwest. Mehan Garden was a residential settlement with craft production when the Parián situated the area. Archaeological excavation found Fujian porcelain, Kraak wares, Jingdezhen porcelain, and Hizen wares within the garden, and items from the 16th to 20th centuries, Excavations in 2001 found pottery dating from the Ming dynasty 8 feet (2.4 m) deep.

The archaeology indicates that the site was densely populated. However, after the British occupation of Manila in the 18th century, it was cleared of buildings as part of a policy of making the city walls more effective by surrounding them with a green belt. The precise use of the land appears to be undocumented prior to the establishment of a botanical garden (Jardin Botánico) in the 19th century. The garden was established on September 13, 1858, by a decree of Governor-General Fernándo Norzagaray y Escudero and was also intended to be a school of agriculture. It is claimed to be the second botanic garden in Manila after a botanic garden in Malate founded in 1791, which eventually deteriorated and was abandoned.

The low-lying site proved not to be ideal for horticulture, but the colonial government, which maintained the Jardin Botánico, did not want to meet the cost of moving the infrastructure. In the 1860s a forestry service (Inspección de Montes) was established in the Philippines and this was given control of the botanical garden. The best known director of the botanic garden was Sebastián Vidal who came to the Philippines in 1871 to work in the forestry service. He was director of the botanical garden between 1878 and his death in 1889. (Note: Other directors included Domingo Vidal and, during Sebastián’s absence from the colony in 1883, José Sainz de Baranda on an acting basis. Vidal, who had the habit of naming plants after people who had helped him, named 13 species after Baranda.) Vidal's obituary in Popular Science Monthly described him as "practically a pioneer in the investigation of the Philippine flora". (In fact, a flora of the archipelago had been published by Francisco Manuel Blanco, but it was unsatisfactory). During his years in Manila, he made some trips back to Europe and his publications on Philippine flora were based not only on specimens he and his team collected locally, but also on his studies of Malesian flora held in European herbaria, such as the Kew Herbarium.

Vidal improved the site by closing some public footpaths and giving the garden a fence. A band played weekly to those permitted to enter the garden. After the death of Vidal, funds were raised by public subscription and a statue sculpted by Enric Clarasó was erected to him in the garden. However, the garden went into decline.

=== American period ===
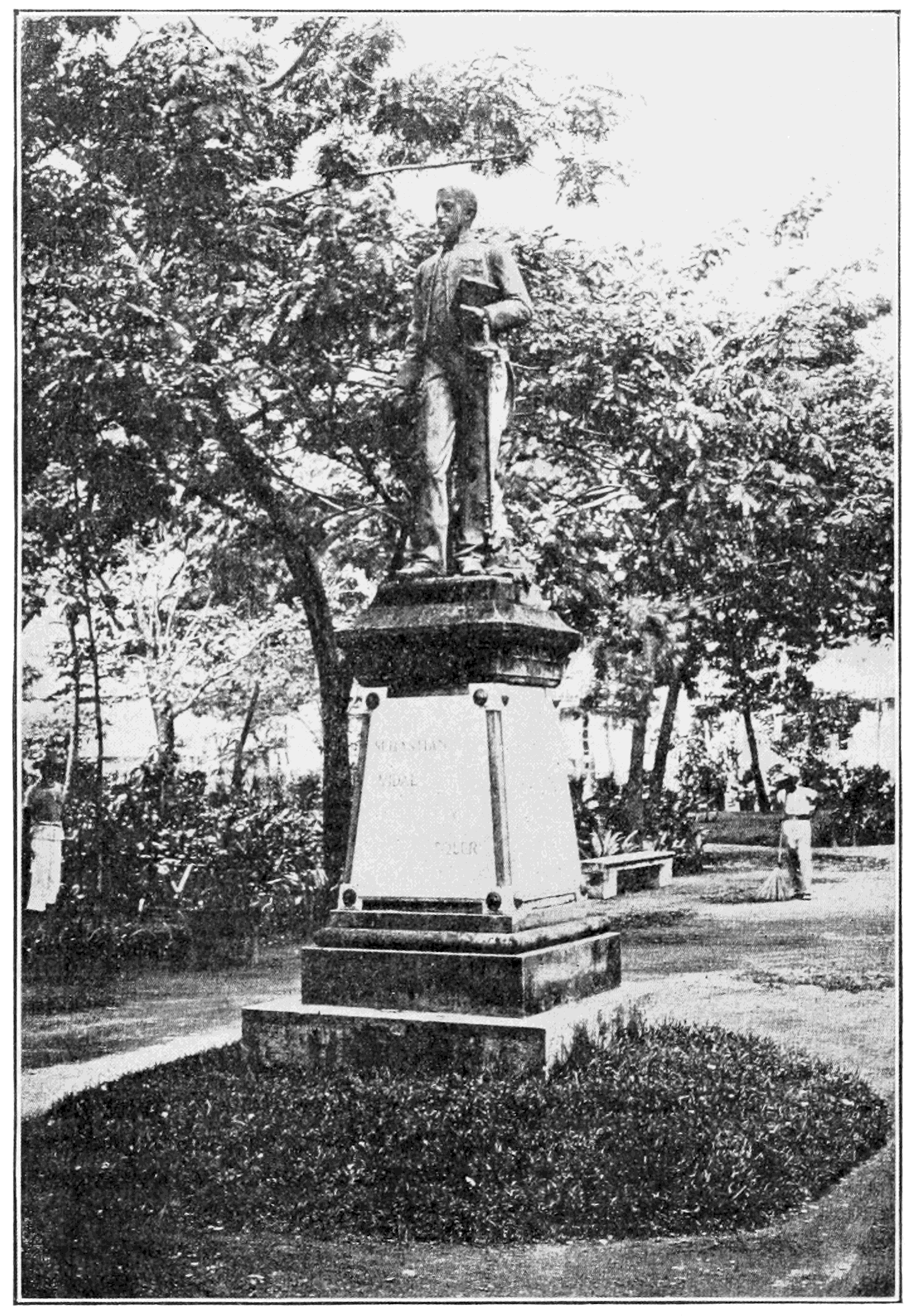
The statue of Vidal in Mehan Garden, c. 1903 – c. 1904.

American authorities found the site unsuitable for a botanic garden. They then renovated it and converted the garden to a park. It was renamed Mehan Garden in 1913 after US Army officer John C. Mehan, who was assigned as chief of the American Park and Sanitation superintendent in Manila. The public park also became a known site for people in Manila. In 1929, the city of Manila leased around 8,293 m^{2} (2.049 acres) of public land used as a flower market of Mehan Garden for the site of the Manila Metropolitan Theater.

Mehan Garden was declared a historical site by the Philippine Historical Research and Markers Committee in 1934. It eventually deteriorated due to flooding, as it was situated several feet from the Pasig River. The garden had a zoological park with "most of [the animals] not suited to [the] climate". It was constructed during the term of Tomas Earnshaw as Manila mayor.

=== Post-American period ===
Following World War II, Boy Scouts of the Philippines (BSP) co-founder Don Gabriel Daza established the first BSP national office in the garden. The office was in a quonset hut. In 1949, the BSP relocated after receiving a land grant from Republic Act No. 397.

Mehan Garden was a public park until 1960, and eventually deteriorated. The first archaeological project took place in the park from 1967 to 1968 by the National Museum of the Philippines as an effort to find pre-Hispanic sites in Manila. By 1987, the site was converted into a cemented open auditorium and hosted gardening and handicraft market stalls. It also hosted a bust of Sebastián Vidal. The park also became known as Sining Kayumanggi after an art exhibit of Filipino artists was held. (Note: lit. 'brown art')

In 2001, Manila mayor Lito Atienza announced the construction of the Lawton Park n' Ride and a new location of the City College of Manila (now the Universidad de Manila) in the site. Another excavation occurred in 2001. The National Museum then declared several parks, along with Mehan Garden, as a site of national archeological importance. The construction received opposition from environmentalists, who argued for the preservation of heritage and green spaces. The construction of the buildings was eventually finished. The Lawton Park n' Ride, built by a Makati-based Park n' Ride Inc. for ₱48.5 million and intended as a transportation hub and retail center, opened on December 2001.

The garden underwent renovations in 2015 and opened the following year. According to Manila mayor Isko Moreno, the city government closed the park in 2019 because of vandalism and incidents of public sex in the restroom. After cleaning and installation of lighting, the park was reopnened in September of the same year.

== Details ==
Mehan Park is a park around 500 meters (1,600 ft) from Arroceros Urban Forest Park and south of Pasig River. The entire park is enclosed by fencing. The garden has a fountain and is bounded by the Manila Metropolitan Theater to the south and the Lawton Park n' Ride to the north. The Garden is the open space off Liwasang Bonifacio (across the Philippine Post Office Main Building), bounded by Taft Avenue, LRT 1 Central Terminal station, and Manila City Hall.

Parts of Mehan Garden became Bonifacio Shrine and Universidad de Manila. A statue of Vidal was in the park in the colonial period; its head was removed during the Japanese era and eventually disappeared. A bronze sculpture to Russian poet Alexander Pushkin was unveiled at the park on January 29, 2010. An air quality monitoring system is also installed in the park.

Mehan Garden serves as an events venue and a bazaar in several holidays such as Valentine's and Christmas.

== Gallery ==
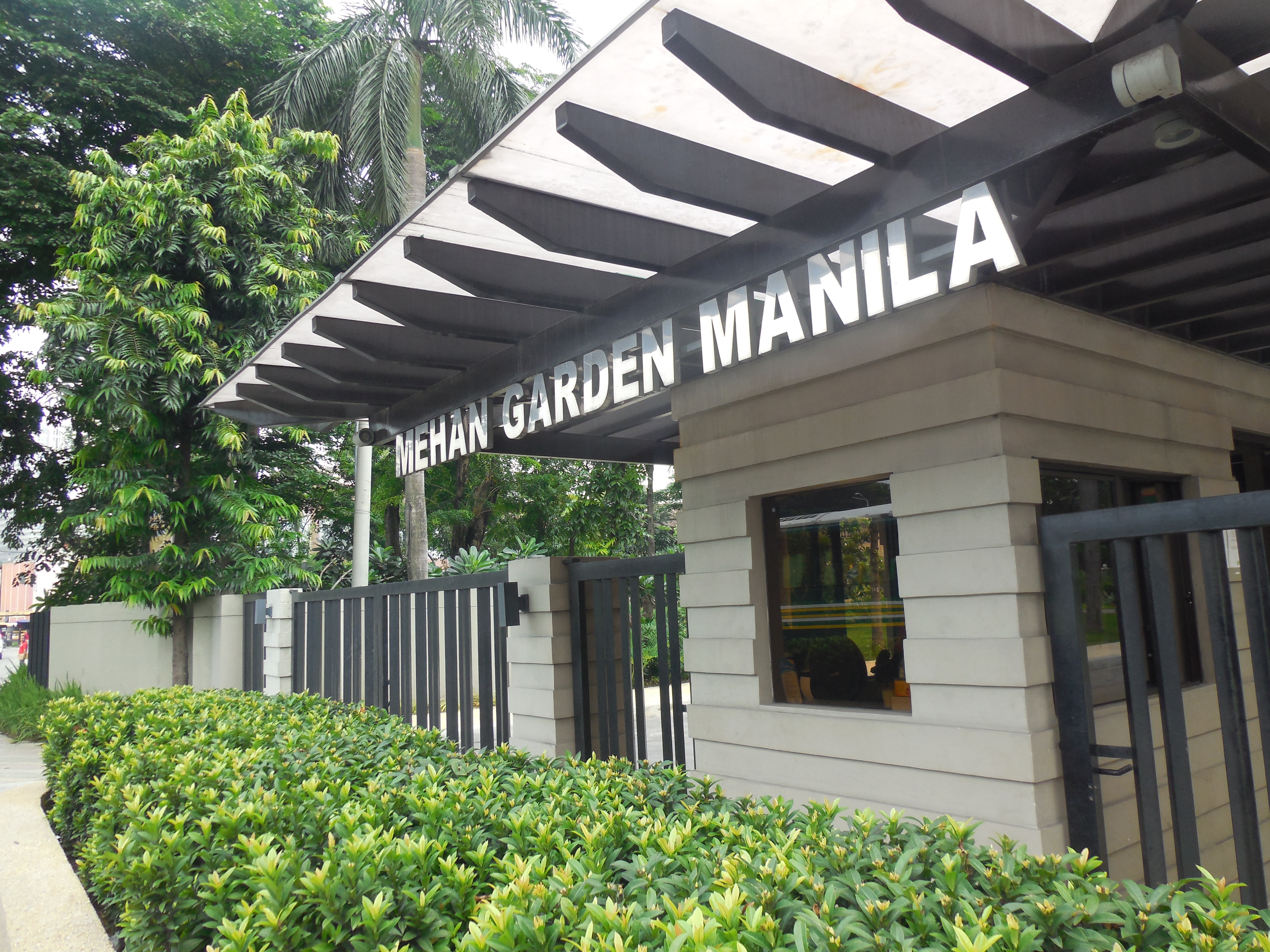
The main gate of the newly renovated Mehan Garden in 2016.

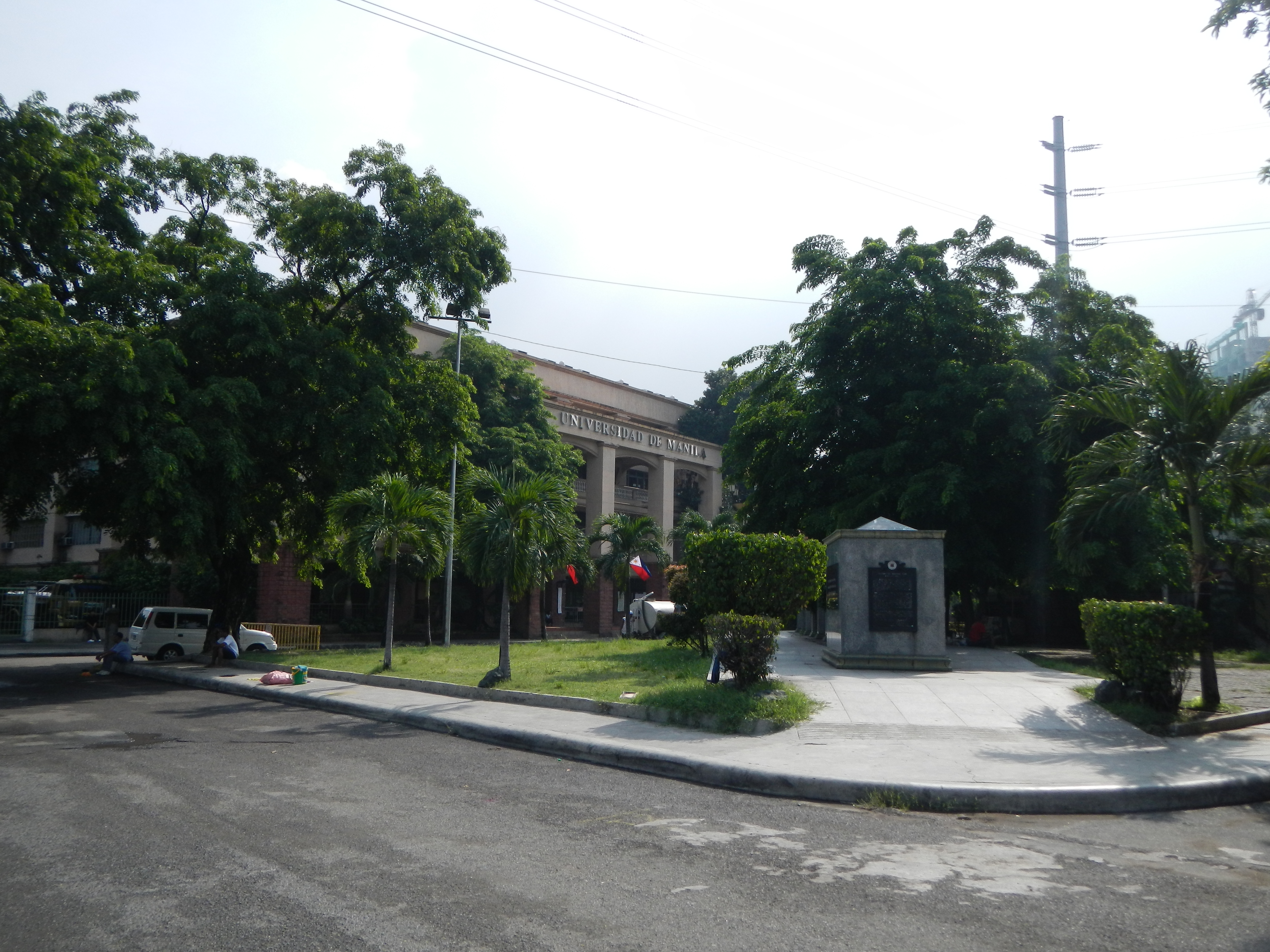
Universidad de Manila inside Mehan Garden.

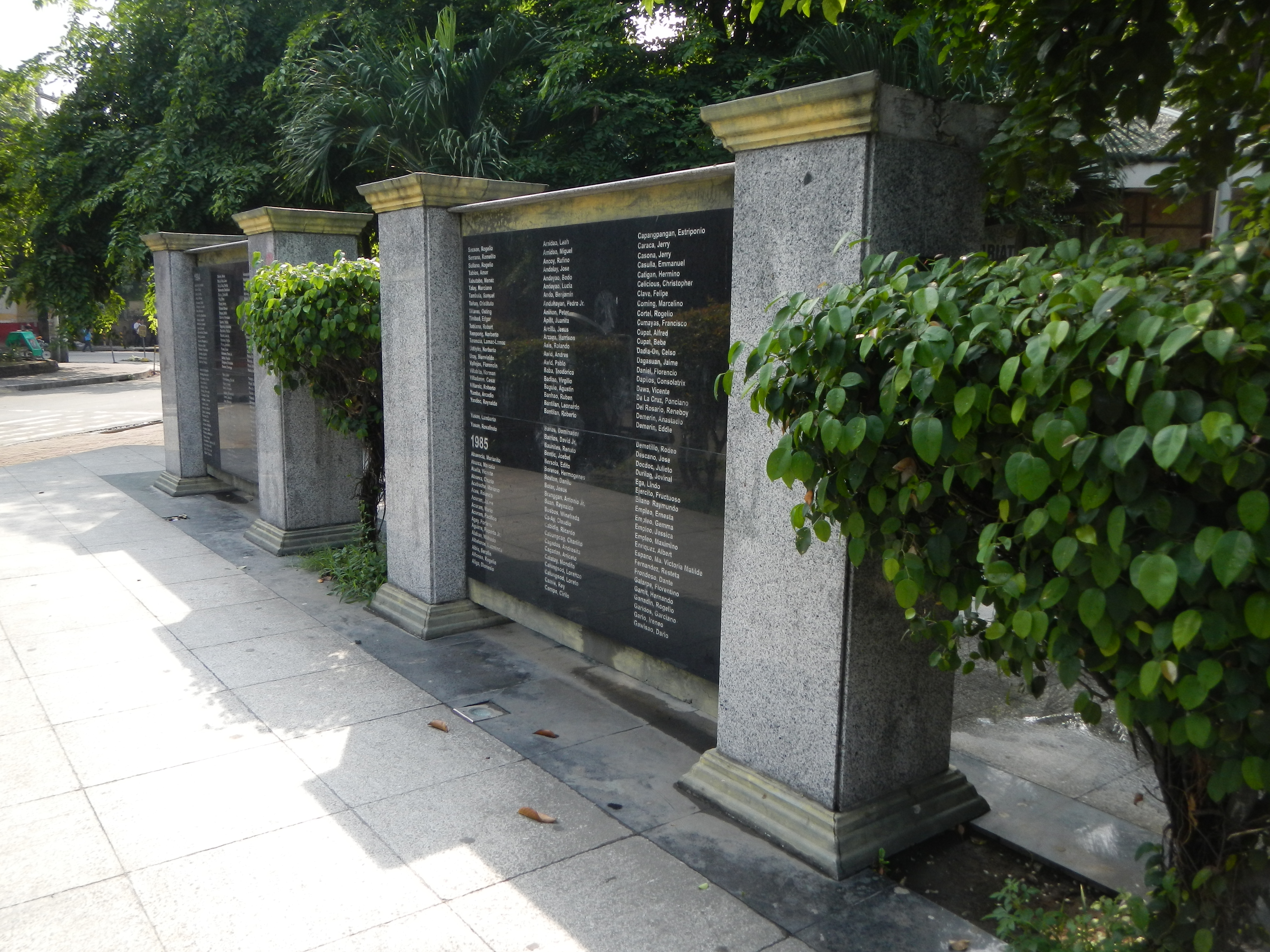
Victims of Marcos' Martial Law Memorial Wall at the Mehan Garden.

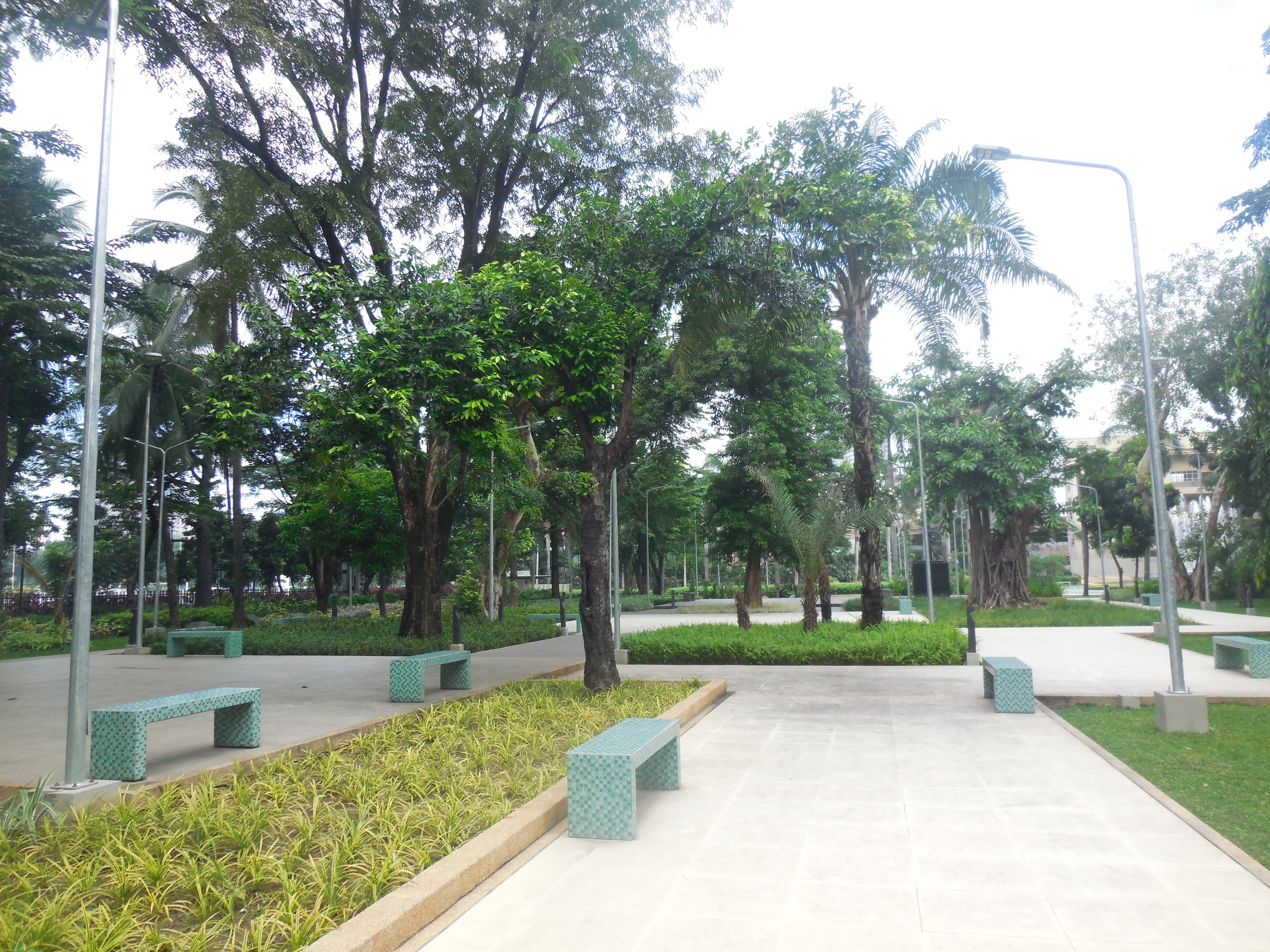
The look of the newly renovated Mehan Garden in 2016.

== See also ==
- List of parks in Manila

== Notes and references ==
=== Bibliography ===
- Cuevas, Nida T. (2019). "Fujian and Hizen Ware: A 17th Century Evidence of the Manila Galleon Trade Found from Selected Archaeological Sites in the Philippines". In Wu, Chunming; Junco Sanchez, Roberto; Liu, Miao (eds.). Archaeology of Manila Galleon Seaports and Early Maritime Globalization. Vol. 2. Singapore: Springer Singapore. pp. 115–128. doi:10.1007/978-981-32-9248-2_6. ISBN 978-981-329-247-5.
- Hseih, Ellen (2017). Early Spanish Colonialism in Manila, the Philippines: An historical archaeological viewpoint (PhD thesis). University of California: Los Angeles.
- Hseih, Ellen (2025). The Archaeology of Early Colonial Manila: A Hybrid City in Global History. University Press of Florida. ISBN 9780813073637.
- Madulid, D. A. (December 1987). "On Developing a Strategy for a National Botanic Garden in Metro Manila, Notes on the First Botanic Garden in the Philippines". ASBP Communication. 1 (2). Association of Systematic Biologists of the Philippines.
- Munarriz, Maria Lourdes T.; Perez, Preecess Julee A.; Caguimbal, Rory S. (2015). "Urban Renewal of the City of Manila and its Impact to Environment and Physical Design". Espasyo: Journal of Architecture and Allied Arts in the Philippines. 6: 77–91.
