= People Power Monument =

Monument in Quezon City, Philippines

- Monumento ng Lakas ng Bayan
- People Power Monument decorated with yellow ribbons during Ninoy Aquino Day
- Interactive map of People Power Monument
- Location: Barangay Camp Aguinaldo, Quezon City, Philippines
- Coordinates: 14°36′00″N 121°03′36″E
- Designer: Eduardo Castrillo
- Height: 18 m (59 ft)
- Opening date: 1993
- Dedicated to: The memory of the EDSA People Power Revolution

The People Power Monument is an 18-meter-high (59 ft) monument built to commemorate the events of the 1986 People Power Revolution. The monument is located on the corner of Epifanio de los Santos Avenue and White Plains Avenue in Barangay Camp Aguinaldo, Quezon City, Philippines. It was made by Eduardo Castrillo in 1993. It is about 0.90 kilometers (0.56 mi) from the EDSA Shrine, another monument built to commemorate the event.

== Description ==
The monument is set atop an elevated position and is pyramidal in composition. The first and middle tiers are composed of statues of people from all sectors of the society. The first tier is composed of a chain of men and women with arms linked together. One man at the end of the chain, who is identified as Ninoy Aquino, is pointing towards EDSA Shrine and the Ortigas Area.

The middle tier represents various people, young and old, who had joined the protest; some of the statues are that of a musician, a mother carrying an infant, a man sporting the "Laban" sign, and priests and nuns. On the top tier of the monument is a towering female figure with arms raised toward the sky. The figure have unchained shackles on her wrist which represent freedom. From the back of the composition rises a large flag and staff.

As with any other artistic works in the Philippines, the monument is protected by copyright according to the Intellectual Property Office of the Philippines.

== November 2016 protests ==
In November 2016, the monument became a gathering point where anti-Marcos groups, Martial Law victims and political figures gathered at the monument to denounce the surprise burial of Ferdinand Marcos at the Libingan ng mga Bayani (Hero's Cemetery) that took place on November 18, 2016. Protesters condemned the hero's burial citing wide-scale plunder and human rights abuses during the Marcos dictatorship. Members and former members of the Cabinet were among the protesters.

== 7 Symbols of Peace nomination ==
In May 2018, the monument was nominated as one of the seven symbols of world peace through the #7Peace #PeoplePower initiative.

== Trillion Peso March ==
On 21 September 2025, the monument became a venue for the Trillion Peso March against government corruption.

== June-July 2026 INC rally ==
On 30 June 2026, a group of INC (Iglesia ni Cristo) members started growing around the monument unannounced blocking lanes of traffic along EDSA and White Plains avenue. The gathering aimed to call for government "transparency" and protesting the indictment for plunder against Senator Rodante Marcoleta.

== Gallery ==
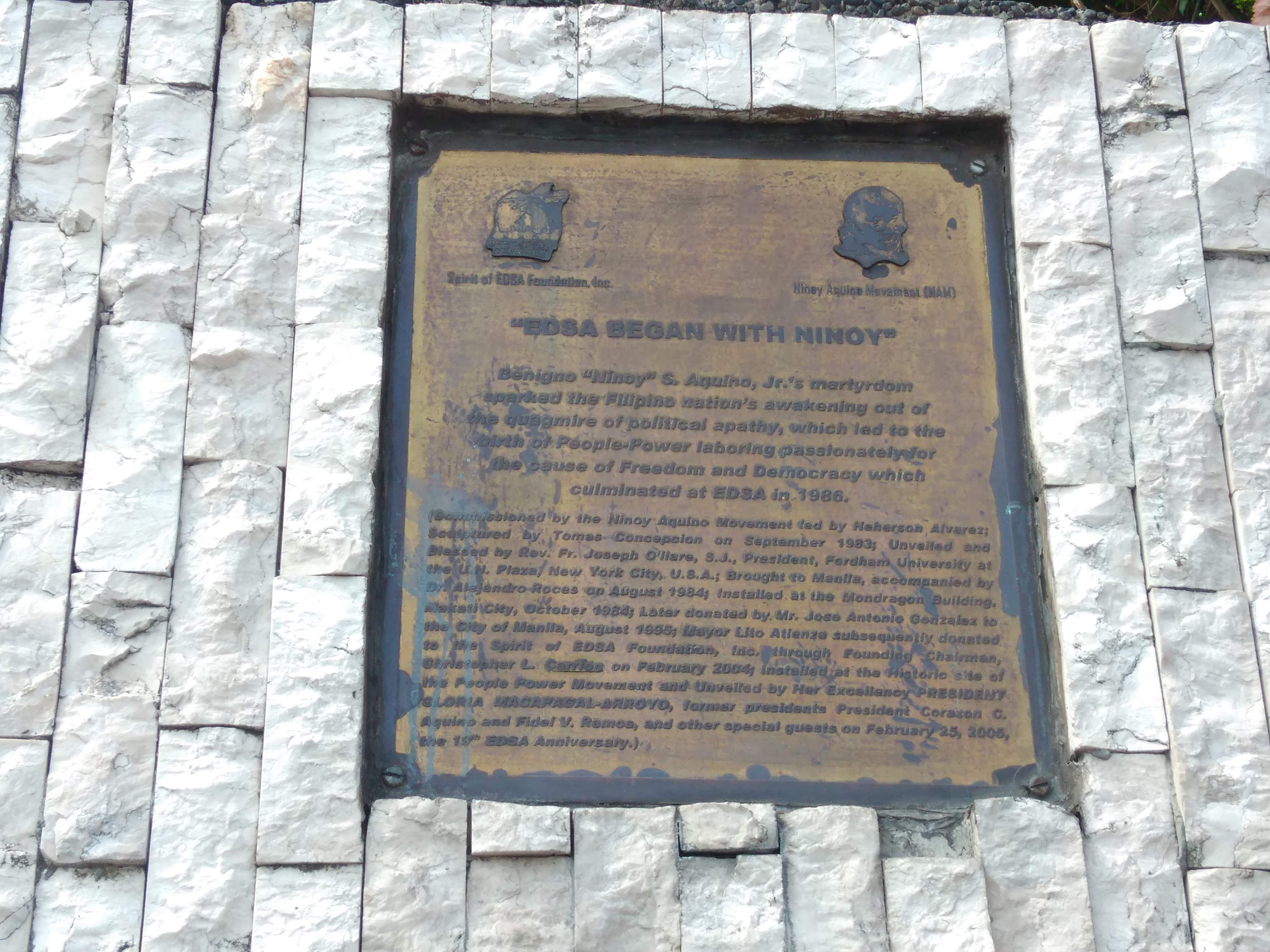
Plaque beneath the Benigno Aquino statue

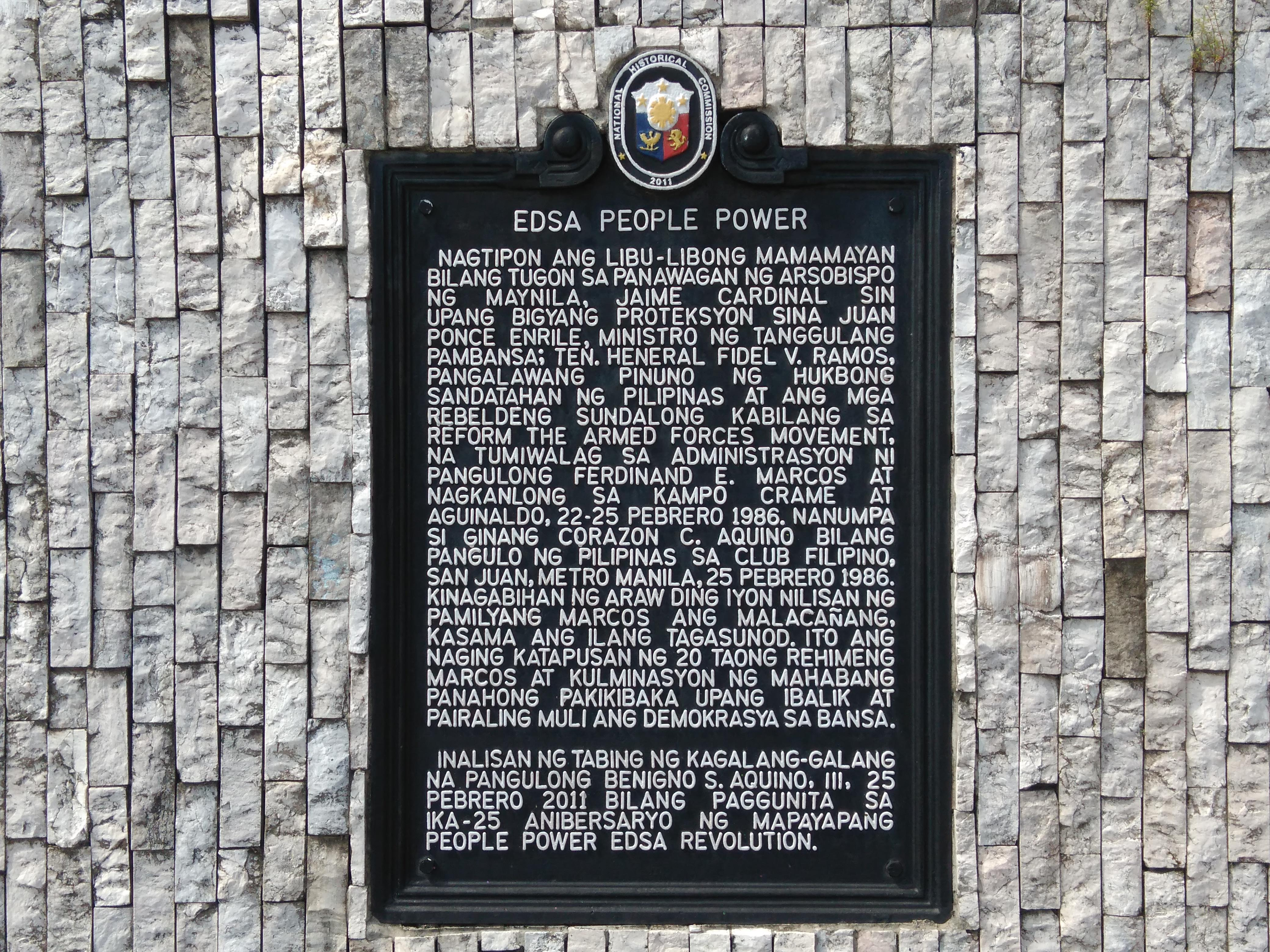
National Historical Commission Marker

== See also ==
- Ferdinand Marcos
- EDSA Revolution of 2001
- EDSA Shrine
- Bantayog ng mga Bayani
- EDSA Tres
- Joseph Estrada
- Gloria Macapagal Arroyo
- People Power Revolution
