= Eduardo Castrillo =

Filipino sculptor (1942–2016)

- Born: Eduardo de los Santos Castrillo; October 31, 1942; Santa Ana, City of Greater Manila, Philippine Commonwealth
- Died: May 18, 2016 (aged 73); Muntinlupa, Metro Manila, Philippines
- Known for: Sculptor and artist
- Movement: Eduardo Castrillo pioneered his own constructivism style of sculpture. He also pioneered the use of materials, and the combination of materials in modern art expressionism in the Philippines. His deliberate contribution to Philippine Public Art and aim of making art available outside of galleries and museums paved the way for modern public art in the country.

Eduardo de los Santos Castrillo (October 31, 1942 – May 18, 2016) was a renowned Filipino sculptor.

== Early life ==
Eduardo Castrillo, commonly known as 'Ed', was born in Santa Ana, City of Greater Manila (now part of Manila), Philippines, on October 31, 1942, the youngest of five children to Santiago Silva Castrillo and Magdalena De los Santos. His father worked as a jeweler, while his mother was a leading actress in zarzuelas and Holy Week pageants.

Castrillo's early years were marked by adversity and challenges. His mother died when he was not yet two, he changed schools several times, and he was depressed as a teenager to the point of being suicidal. He found his place however after he entered the University of Santo Tomas in Manila, where he earned a degree in Fine Arts. Looking for work following his graduation, he approached Levy Hermanos, the owner of the well-known La Estrella del Norte studio in Manila. Hermanos challenged him to design a piece of jewelry then and there. Castrillo responded by producing seven studies, in full color, within twenty minutes. He was hired on the spot as a jewelry designer. The year was 1964.

== Professional career ==
Castrillo broke onto the Filipino arts scene in 1966, when he held his first one-man show at the Northern Motors showroom in Makati, Rizal. That same year, his first major public sculptures were unveiled – “The Virgin” at La Loma Cemetery and “Youth's Cry of Defiance” in Fort Santiago, Manila. During the 1970s, the height of Martial Law under the Marcos dictatorship, Castrillo was considered to be the most avant-garde sculptor in the Philippines. By the 1980s, Castrillo's reputation as a leading artist in his country was beyond dispute. He traveled extensively abroad on cultural visits, giving lectures and conducting research into the origins of early Filipino art.

Castrillo's main medium was metal, especially brass, bronze and steel, from which he created sculptures by hammering, cutting and welding, with the help of a group of assistants. He also incorporated other materials into his works, including wood, plastic, plexiglass, ivory and even neon lights. His oeuvre included freestanding abstract pieces, functional art pieces, art jewelry, body sculptures and liturgical art.

As well as being avant-garde, he was known as a nationalist and for his commitment to the Filipino people. As he told an interviewer from the American news agency, the Associated Press:

Whenever I am doing a big commission, or big art work, particularly in the Philippines, I put myself, I put my artistry aside, and I deal more and I feel more as a social being. A social being that has a responsibility of educating, or orienting the great number of people, because primarily I think that is the thing that we lack around here. For, it is so common among us [Filipinos] to look up to a foreign talent….

Several of Castrillo's most important works are monumental sculptures commemorating Filipino historical events or personalities, including Rajah Sulayman (1976), the People Power Monument (1993), The Battle of Zapote Bridge (1997) and the Bonifacio Shrine (1998).

Outside of the Philippines, his sculptures can be found in France, Singapore, Malaysia and Guam, among other places.

Castrillo served at one time as the head of the Art Association of the Philippines.

== Death ==
Eduardo Castrillo died of cancer on May 18, 2016, at the Asian Hospital and Medical Center in Alabang, Muntinlupa, Metro Manila.

== Awards ==
- Honorable Mention, 18th AAP Annual Sculpture Division, 1967
- Major Award (1 of 4) for Death Touch of Joy, 1st National Sculpture Exhibition, 1968
- 13th Artist Award of the Cultural Center of the Philippines, 1970
- Republic Cultural Heritage Award, 1971
- Araw ng Maynila Centennial Award, 1971
- Ten Outstanding Young Men Award, 1971
- Outstanding Makati Resident Award, 1971
- Outstanding Sta. Ana Resident Award, 1974
- Outstanding Son of Binan Award, Maduro Club, 1980
- Outstanding Son of Laguna Award, Laguna Lion's Club, 1981
- Adopted Son of Cebu, Charter Day of Cebu, 1996
- Green and Gold Artist Award, Far Eastern University, 1998
- Most Outstanding Citizen Award of Quezon City, Quezon City Foundation Day, 2003
- Helping Citizen Award of Imus City, Imus Recognition Day, 2005

Despite his importance to the Philippine art world and the visibility of his major works, Eduardo Castrillo was never named a National Artist of the Philippines – a fact that one arts observer proclaimed was “nothing short of a scandal”.

== Shows (partial listing) ==
- One-Man Show, Northern Motors Showroom, Makati, 1966
- One-Man Show, Hilton Art Center, Manila, 1969
- One-Man Show, Luz Gallery, Makati, 1969
- One-Man Show, Solidaridad, 1971
- One-Man Show, Gelerie Bleue, 1971
- One-Man Show, Agra Gallery, Washington DC, USA, 1973
- One-Man Show, Plaza Hotel, New York City, USA, 1973
- One-Man Show, Via de Parigi, Palm Beach, USA, 1973
- One-Man Show, Gallery 99, Rome, Italy, 1973
- One-Man Show, Impressions Gallery, 1974
- One-Man Show, Sanctuary Gallery, 1974

== Major works ==
- The Virgin (1966), La Loma Cemetery, Metro Manila
- Youth's Cry of Defiance (1966), Fort Santiago, Intramuros, Metro Manila
- Fate of the Oppressed (1971)
- Consolidated Growth through Education (1974), Polytechnic University of the Philippines, Santa Mesa, Metro Manila
- Spirit of Pinaglabanan (1974), San Juan, Metro Manila
- The Redemption (1974), Loyola Memorial Park, Marikina, Metro Manila
- Pagbubungkas (1975), Philippine Heart Center, Quezon City, Metro Manila
- Rajah Sulayman (1976), Plaza Rajah Sulayman, Malate, Metro Manila
- Paghimud-os (1975), Bacolod Capitol Lagoon, Bacolod
- Mag-Ilusyon (1976), Kalayaan Park (formerly Ferdinand-Imelda Park), Legazpi City, Albay
- The Redemption (1977), Metrobank Plaza, Makati, Metro Manila
- Cry of Tondo (1978), Plaza Moriones, Tondo, Metro Manila
- Inang Bayan (1992), Bantayog ng mga Bayani, Diliman, Quezon City, Metro Manila
- People Power Monument (1993) along Epifanio De los Santos Avenue in Quezon City, Metro Manila
- The Heritage of Cebu (1995), Cebu City
- Battle of Zapote Bridge (1997), Las Piñas
- Bonifacio and the Katipunan Revolution Monument (1998), beside Manila City Hall, Metro Manila
- Beyond Broadcasting (2000), GMA Network Center, Quezon City, Metro Manila
- Golden Tribute to the History of Cebu (2012), Insular Life Cebu Business Center, Cebu Business Park, Cebu City
- Mother of All Asia–Tower of Peace (2014), Batangas
- San Juan Bautista (2015), Plaza Carriedo, Quiapo Church, Metro Manila
- Execution of Rizal, Rizal Park, Metro Manila
- Ang Mga Bisig, Philippine International Convention Center, Metro Manila

== See also ==
Paras-Perez, Rodolfo. Beyond Art. Manila, Philippines: Vera-Reyes, 1975. (documentation of the "Huling Hapunan", the depiction of the Last Supper with Christ and the Twelve Apostles, a large-scale sculpture project of Eduardo Castrillo)
