= Bonifacio Shrine =

Public park in Manila, Philippines

- Kartilya ng Katipunan
- The shrine in June 2013
- Interactive map of Bonifacio Shrine
- Location: Ermita, Manila, Philippines
- Coordinates: 14°35′27.3″N 120°58′51.9″E
- Designer: Eduardo Castrillo
- Completion date: 1998
- Dedicated to: Andres Bonifacio and the Katipunan

The Bonifacio Shrine, also known as the Kartilya ng Katipunan or Heroes Park, is a public park and plaza in Ermita, Manila, Philippines located just north of the Manila City Hall and south of Mehan Garden and Liwasang Bonifacio. Its centerpiece is the monument to Filipino revolutionary Andrés Bonifacio and the Philippine Revolution fronting Padre Burgos Avenue.

== History ==
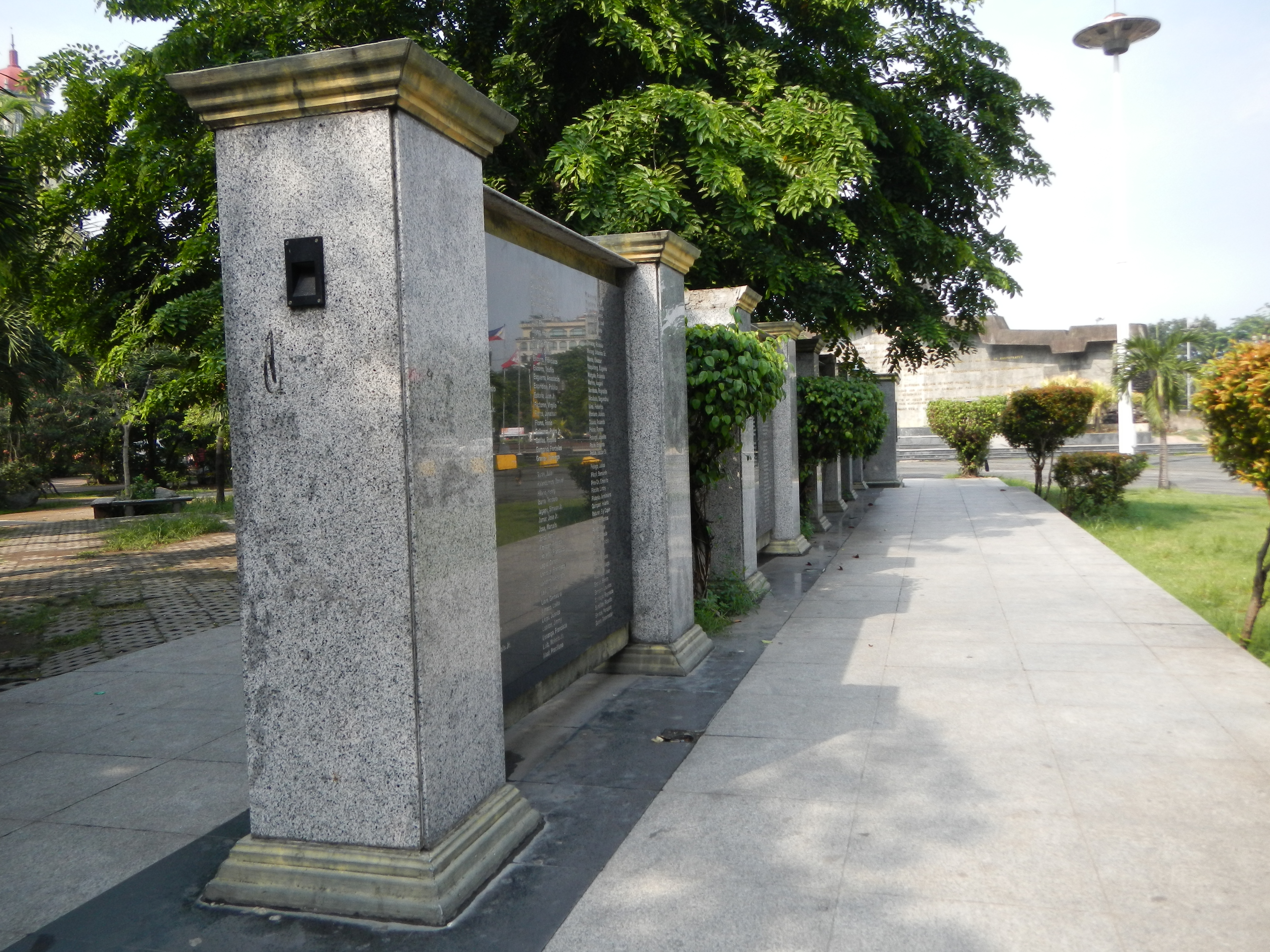
The Victims of Martial Law Memorial Wall, which was inaugurated in September 2006.

The Bonifacio and the Katipunan Revolution Monument, situated within the grounds of the Bonifacio Shrine, and designed by Filipino sculptor Eduardo Castrillo, was unveiled in 1998. On September 21, 2006, the Victims of Martial law Memorial Wall was inaugurated at the park under the leadership of Mayor Lito Atienza. In 2019, the plaza was rehabilitated upon the orders of Mayor Isko Moreno who ordered the removal of occupying vendors, additional flora, planting of Bermuda grass and a central fountain in front of the Bonifacio monument. The city's continuous cleanup and removal of illegal vendors made visible the bronze monument commemorating Emilio Jacinto, which had been obscured for several years.

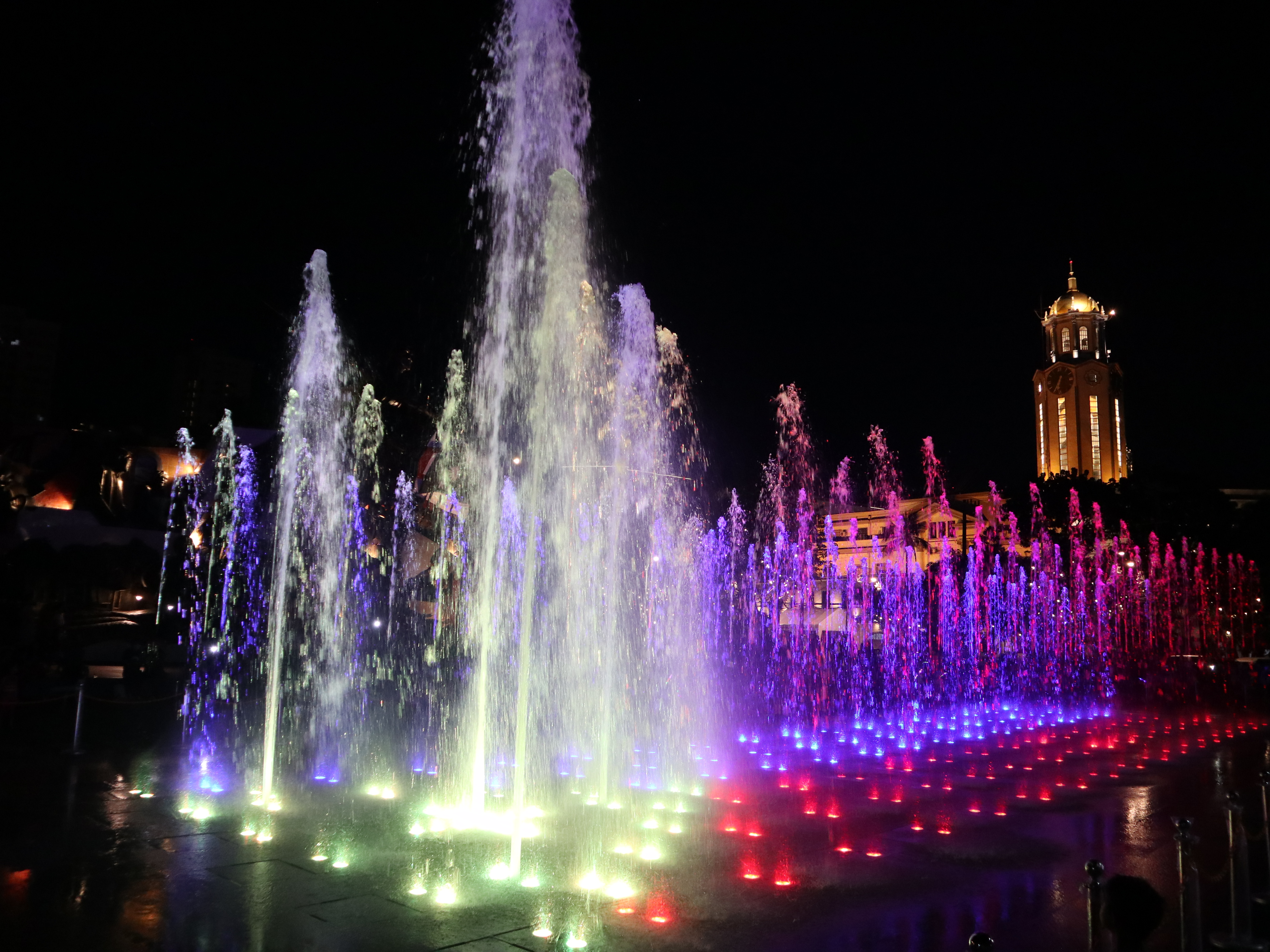
Fountain in front of the shrine with Philippine flag-inspired lighting

A musical dancing fountain was installed in front of the shrine monument. It was inaugurated in February 2020. A café named Kapetolyo was also opened at the park on October 1, 2020.
