= Jose Mendoza =

Jose Mendoza may refer to:

- José Mendoza (Honduran footballer) (born 1989), Honduran football player
- Jose C. Mendoza (born 1947), associate justice of the Supreme Court of the Philippines of the Supreme Court of the Philippines
- Jose M. Mendoza, Filipino sculptor
- Jose Mendoza Lopez (1910–2005), Mexican and United States Army soldier who won the Medal of Honor
- José Mendoza Perdomo (born 1993), Mexican volleyball player
- José Mendoza (Peruvian footballer) (born 1982), Peruvian football player
- José Mendoza, a character in the manga and anime series Ashita no Joe
