= Rizal Park =

Historic urban park in Manila, Philippines

- Liwasang Rizal (Filipino)
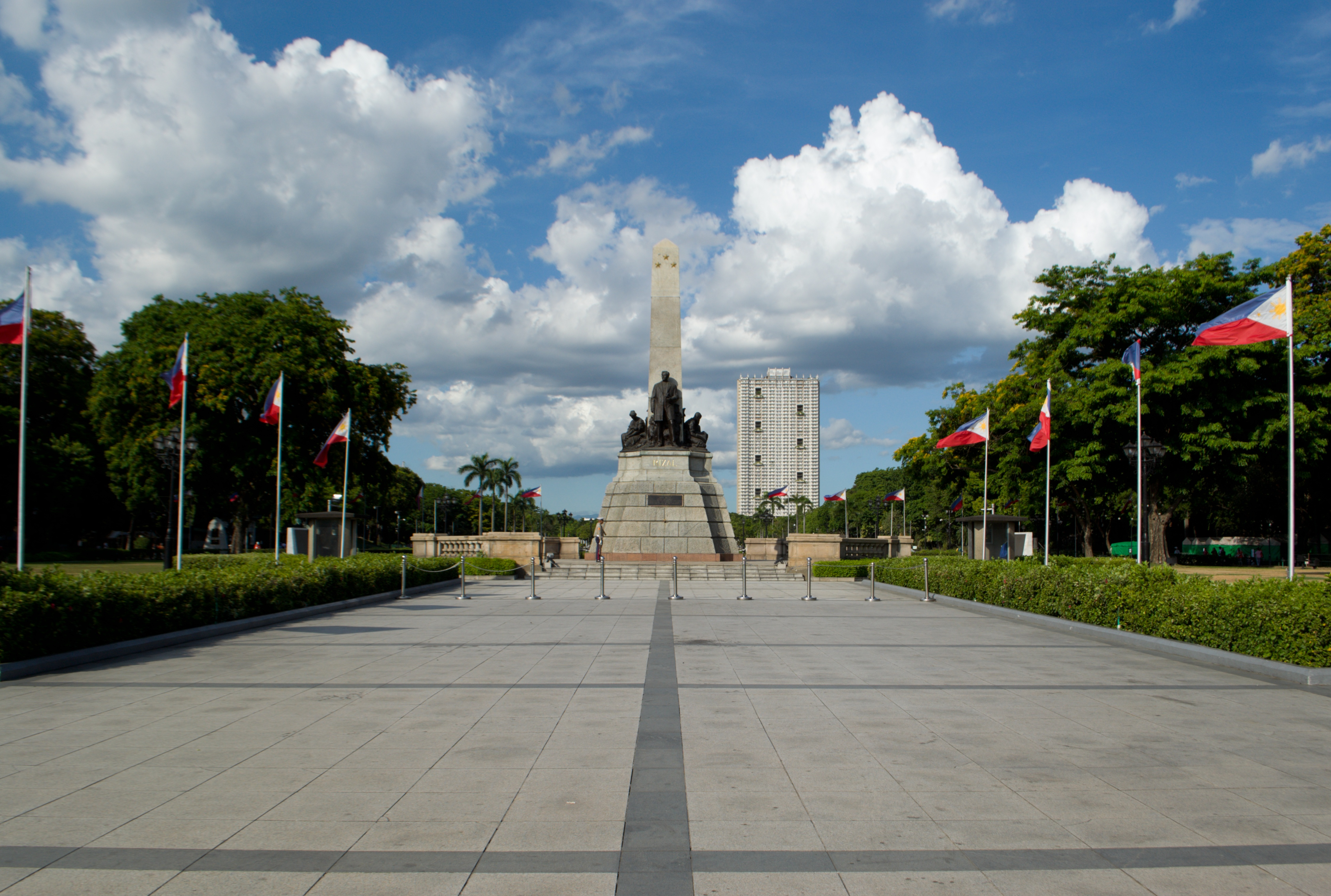
- The Rizal Monument in Rizal Park
- Interactive map of Rizal Park
- Type: Urban park
- Location: Ermita, Manila
- Coordinates: 14°34′57″N 120°58′42″E
- Area: 58 hectares (140 acres)
- Created: 1820
- Administrator: National Parks Development Committee
- Plants: 3,497 trees (2015)
- Species: 112 tree species (2015)
- Public transit: United Nations
- Website: rizal.npdc.gov.ph

Rizal Park, Luneta (Filipino: Liwasang Rizal, Luneta), also known as Rizal Park, Luneta Park, or simply Luneta, is a historic urban park located in Ermita, Manila, Philippines. It is one of the largest urban parks in the country, covering an area of 58 hectares (140 acres). The area now occupied by the park was known as Bagumbayan during the Spanish colonial period. It is adjacent to the historic walled city of Intramuros.

Situated on the eastern shore of Manila Bay, the park has played a significant role in Philippine history. The execution of Filipino patriot José Rizal on December 30, 1896, at the site helped galvanize support for the Philippine Revolution against Spain. The park was later named in his honor, and the monument enshrining his remains serves as its symbolic focal point. The inauguration of the Third Philippine Republic and the formal recognition of Philippine independence by the United States took place there on July 4, 1946. The park has also been the site of major political demonstrations, including those associated with Ferdinand Marcos and Corazon Aquino, culminating in the People Power Revolution of 1986.

In December 2021, the National Parks Development Committee adopted the branding "Rizal Park, Luneta" to distinguish the park from other locations bearing the name "Rizal Park".

== History ==
=== Spanish colonial period ===
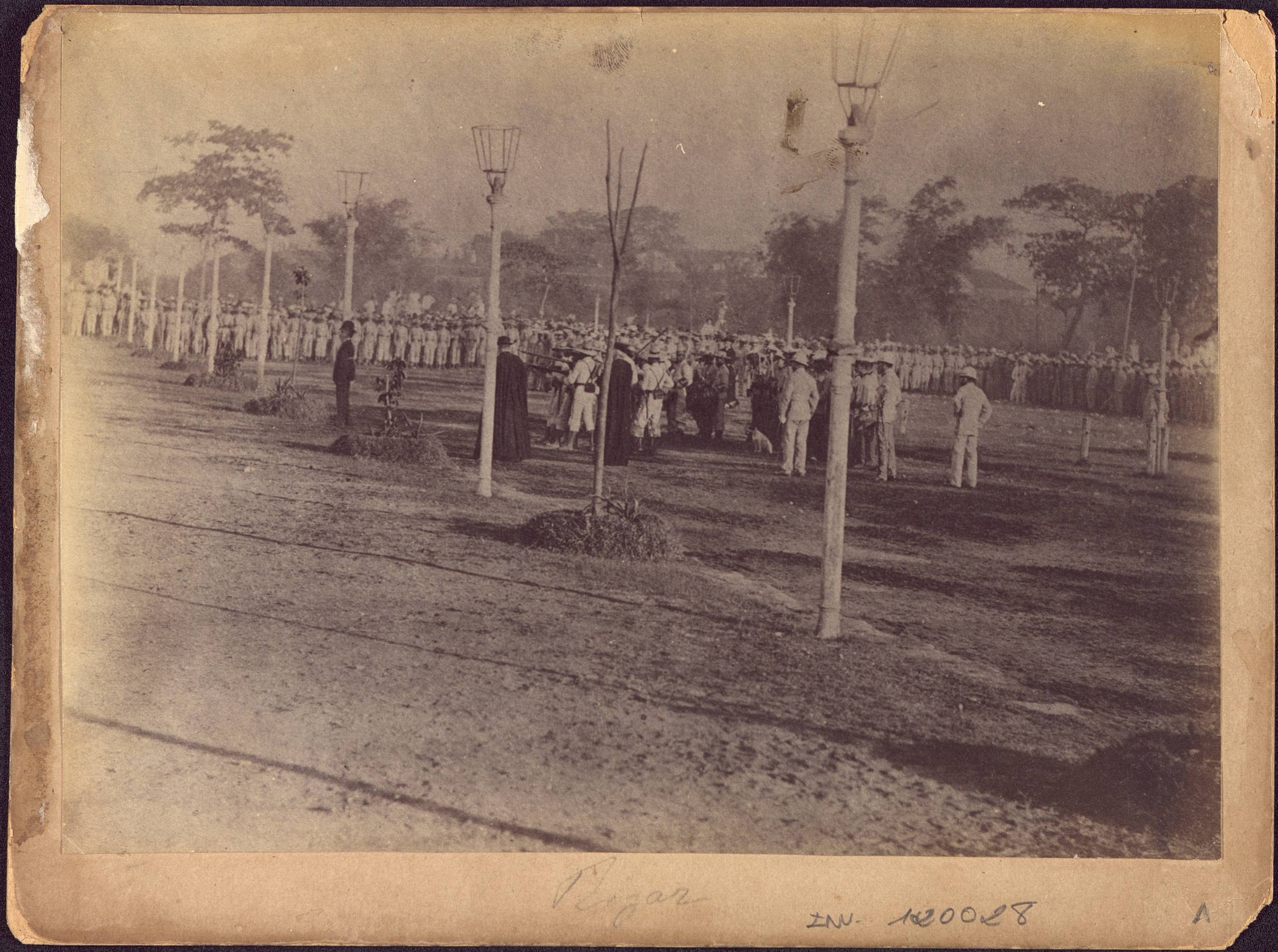
The execution of José Rizal on December 30, 1896

Rizal Park's history began in 1820 when the Paseo de Luneta was completed just south of the walls of Manila on a marshy patch of land next to the beach during the Spanish rule. Prior to the park, the marshy land was the location of a small town called Barrio Nuevo (Spanish for "New Borough", Bagumbayan in Tagalog) that dates back to 1601. The town and its churches, being close to the walled city, were strategically used as cover by the British during their attack. The Spanish authorities anticipated the danger posed by the settlements that immediately surrounded Intramuros in terms of external attacks, yet Church officials advocated for these villages to remain. Because of the part they played during the British Invasion, they were cleared after the short rule of the British from 1762 to 1764.

The church of Bagumbayan originally enshrined the Black Nazarene. Because of the order to destroy the village and its church, the image was then transferred to San Nicolas de Tolentino inside Intramuros, with a copy then translated to Quiapo Church. This has since been commemorated by the Traslación of the relic every January 9, which is more commonly known as the Feast of the Black Nazarene. This is why the processions of January 9 have begun there in the park beginning in 2007.

After the clearing of the Bagumbayan settlement, the area later became known as Bagumbayan Field where the Cuartel la Luneta (Luneta Barracks), a Spanish Military Hospital (which was destroyed by one of the earthquakes of Manila), and a moat-surrounded outwork of the walled city of Manila, known as the Luneta (lunette) because of its crescent shape.

West of Bagumbayan Field was the Paseo de la Luneta (Plaza of the Lunette) named after the fortification, not because of the shape of the plaza which was a long 100-by-300-meter (330 ft × 980 ft) rectangle ended by two semicircles. It was also named Paseo de Alfonso XII (Plaza of Alfonso XII), after Alfonso XII, King of Spain during his reign from 1874 to 1885. Paseo de la Luneta was the center of social activity for the people of Manila in the early evening hours This plaza was arranged with paths and lawns and surrounded by a wide driveway called "La Calzada" (The Road) where carriages circulate.

During the Spanish period from 1823 to 1897 most especially in the latter part, the place became notorious for public executions. A total of 158 political enemies of Spain were executed in the park. On February 17, 1872, three Filipino priests, Mariano Gomez, José Burgos, and Jacinto Zamora, collectively known as Gomburza, were executed by garrote, accused of subversion arising from the 1872 Cavite mutiny.

=== American colonial period ===
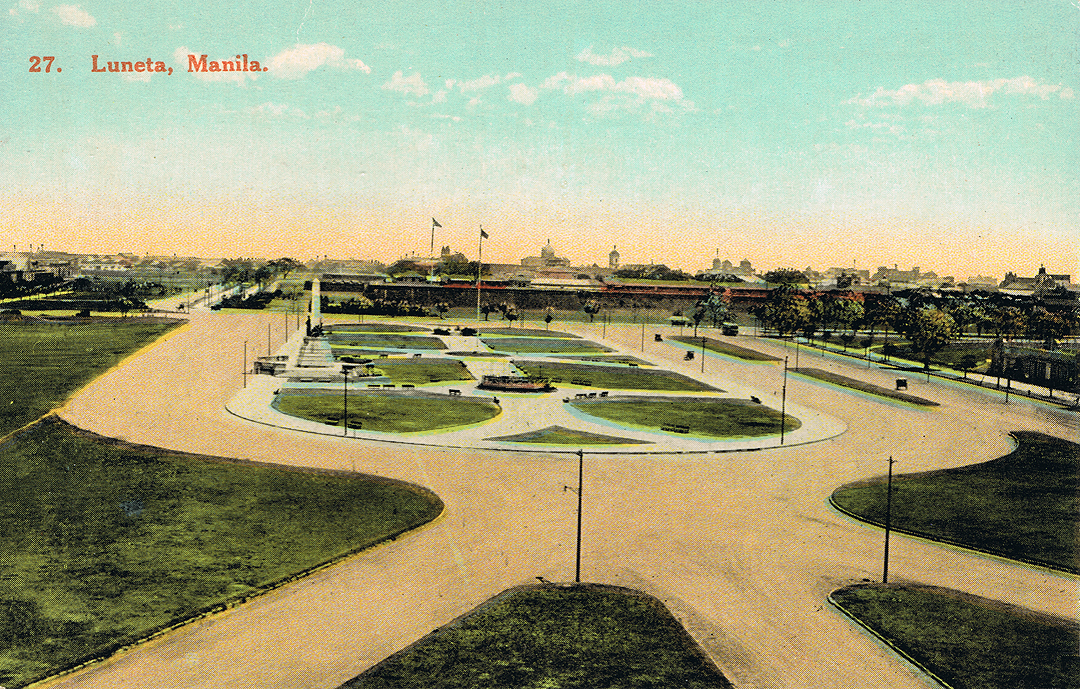
The Paseo de Luneta, around 1920s (The Rizal Monument was already present)

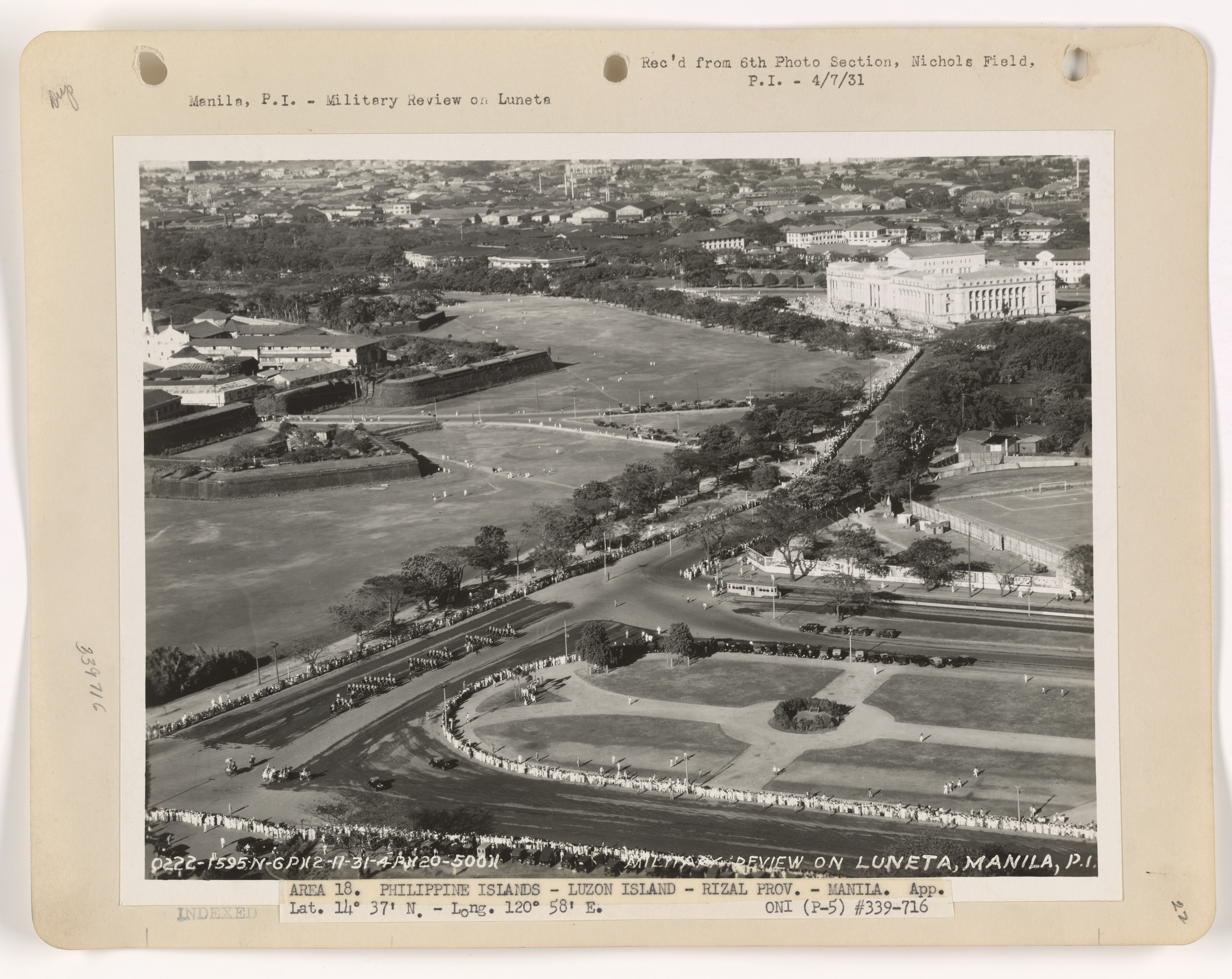
Military review on Luneta (lower right), 1931

It was during the American colonial period in the Philippines, when the Rizal Park's main landmark, the Rizal Monument was built. On September 28, 1901, the United States Philippine Commission approved Act No. 243, which would erect a monument in Luneta to commemorate the memory of José Rizal, Filipino patriot, writer and poet. The shrine was inaugurated on December 30, 1913, coinciding with Rizal's 17th death anniversary.

The park, particularly the area that was then called Wallace Field (formerly Paseo de San Carlos, transl. Plaza of Saint Charles) and later United Nations Park, was also chosen as the site of a national government center by Daniel Burnham, architect and city planner, who was commissioned by William Howard Taft to do the city plan of Manila in 1902. According to Burnham's plan, government buildings to be built in the park will have Neo-classical edifices with Greco-Roman columns. A large Capitol building, which was envisioned to be the Philippine version of the United States Capitol, was to become its core. It was to be surrounded by other government buildings, but only two of those buildings were built around Agrifina Circle, facing each other. They are the Department of Agriculture (now the National Museum of Anthropology) and the Department of Finance (later became the Department of Tourism and now the National Museum of Natural History). These two buildings were completed before the World War II. The park was also intended to become a Philippine version of the National Mall in Washington, D.C., with the planned building of government offices.

The site also served as a venue of the Manila Carnival and various expositions prior to the outbreak of World War II.

=== Post-Commonwealth era ===
Proclamation of independence at Rizal Park on July 4, 1946

In August 1954, President Ramon Magsaysay created the Jose Rizal National Centennial Commission to organize and manage the celebrations for the centennial of José Rizal's birth. Its plans include building a grand monument of José Rizal and the Rizal Memorial Cultural Center that would contain a national theater, a national museum, and a national library at the Luneta. The site was declared a national park on December 19, 1955, by virtue of Proclamation No. 234 signed by Magsaysay. The Luneta National Park spans an area of approximately 16.24 hectares (40.1 acres) covering the area surrounding the Rizal Monument. The Commission of Parks and Wildlife (now Biodiversity Management Bureau) managed the site upon its establishment as a protected area.

In 1957, President Carlos P. Garcia issued Proclamation No. 470 transferring the administration of the national park to the Jose Rizal National Centennial Commission. In 1961, in commemoration of Rizal's birth centennial, the National Library was inaugurated at the park. Its management was then handed over to the National Parks Development Committee, an attached agency of the Department of Tourism created in 1963 by President Diosdado Macapagal.

In 1967, the Luneta National Park was renamed to Rizal Park with the signing of Proclamation No. 299 by President Ferdinand Marcos. Through donations by the Taiwanese and Japanese governments, the Chinese and Japanese Gardens were set up during Marcos' administration. The Rizal Park under NPDC executive director Teodoro Valencia was expanded. Valencia introduced the "Concert at the Park" event series during his management.

On June 12, 1998, the park hosted many festivities which capped the 1998 Philippine Centennial, the event commemorating a hundred years since the Declaration of Independence from Spain and the establishment of the First Philippine Republic. The celebrations were led by then President Fidel V. Ramos.

=== Contemporary history ===
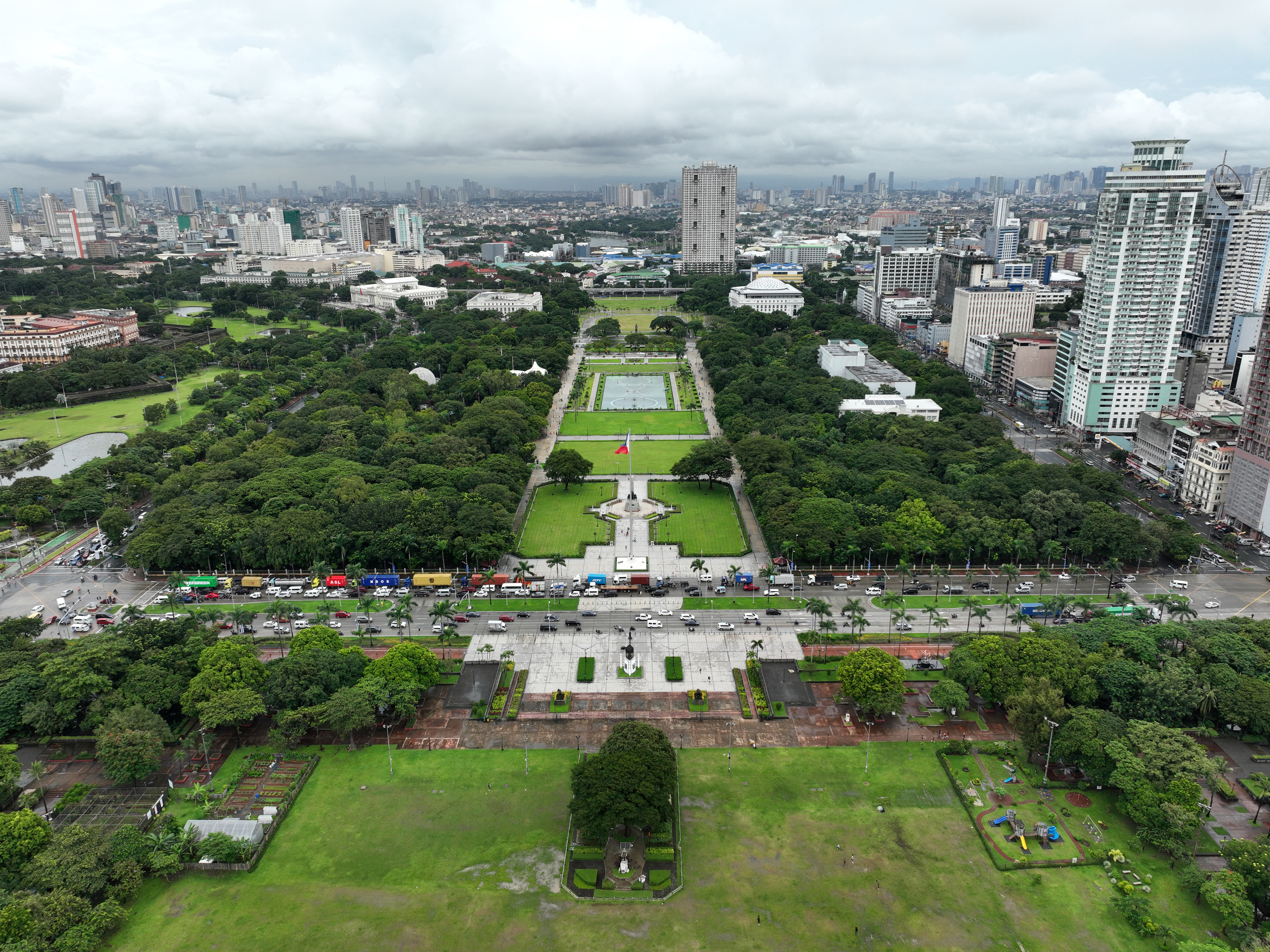
Rizal Park looking eastwards in 2025

Rizal Park was renovated by the National Parks Development Committee in 2011. The German-Filipino William Schaare, who built the old musical dancing fountain at the 40 m × 100 m (130 ft × 330 ft) pool in the 1960s, handled its restoration. Among the other things that were restored were the Flower Clock (now known as the World-Class Filipino Bloom), the Noli Me Tangere Garden and the Luzviminda Boardwalk, which were opened just in time for the 150th birthday celebration of Jose Rizal.

Due to the COVID-19 pandemic, Rizal Park was temporarily closed to the public in March 2020. The COVID-19 community quarantine measures allowed the NDPC to rehabilitate the park. Select sites within the park were later opened. The Manila COVID-19 Field Hospital was also built in the park's Burnham Green, as a temporary facility.

== Notable events ==
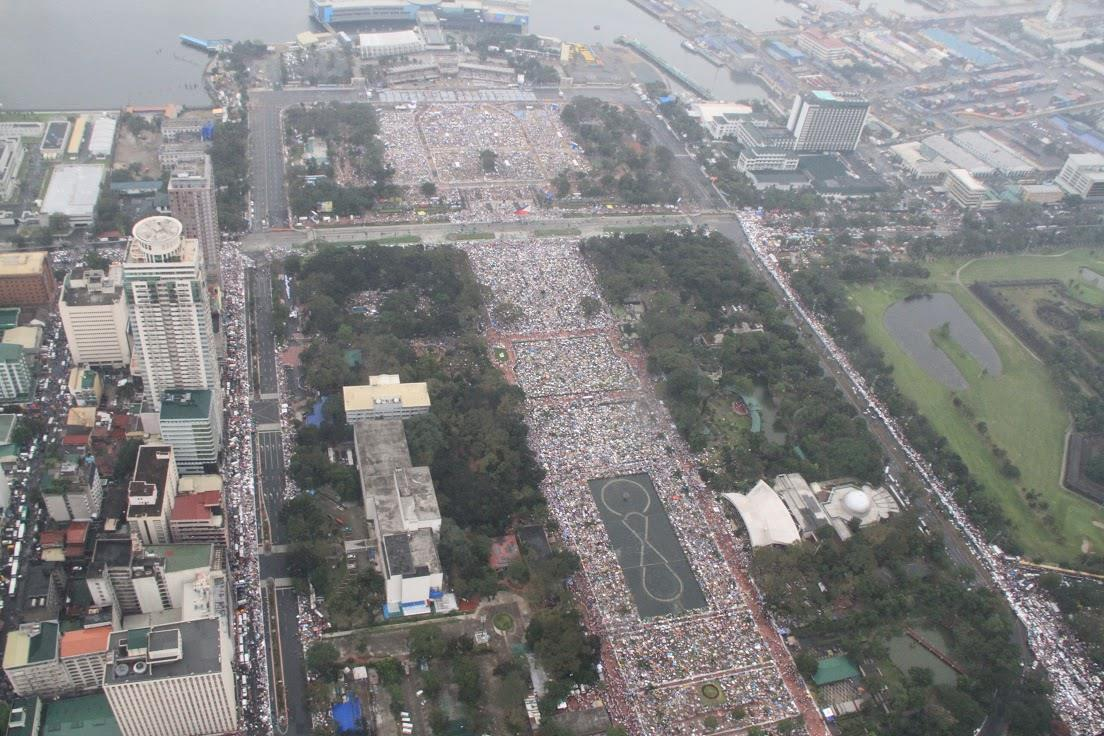
Aerial shot of the Rizal Park during Pope Francis' concluding Mass

- February 18, 1981 – The beatification Mass of Saint Lorenzo Ruiz and companions was held at the park, during the apostolic visit of Pope John Paul II. It is considered the first beatification ceremony ever held outside the Vatican in the church history.
- February 16, 1986 – Various mass protests like the Tagumpay ng Bayan rally were held in the park as opposition to the rule of Ferdinand Marcos. This culminated into the People Power Revolution.
- January 15, 1995 – The closing Mass of the 10th World Youth Day 1995 was held here attended by more than 4 million people. This is the record gathering of the Roman Catholic Church.
- June 12, 1998 – The Philippine Centennial Celebrations featured a Grand Centennial Parade culminating in a fireworks display emanating from ships in Manila Bay that was the most expensive ever produced in the country at the time. Rizal Park had over five million celebrating the one hundredth anniversary of the Philippine Declaration of Independence
- December 31, 1999 – January 1, 2000 – The turn-of-the-century celebration was held here attended by more than 500,000 people.
- October 10, 2004 – The special episode of SOP for the Kapuso Victory Party was held here and aired on GMA Network.
- November 27, 2005 – Rizal Park was the venue of the opening ceremony for the 2005 Southeast Asian Games at the Quirino Grandstand. It was held at an open-air park instead of a stadium, a historic first for the games' opening ceremony. It was again used on December 5, 2005, for the games' closing ceremony.
- August 23, 2010 – The park was the site of the 11-hour hostage crisis where a Hong Thai Travel Services tour group on a coach was hijacked by Rolando Mendoza, causing 9 casualties (including Mendoza) and 9 injuries.
- August 22–26, 2013 – The Million People March was held in the park and other different locations to protest against the improper use of the Priority Development Assistance Fund.
- January 18, 2015 – The concluding Mass of the papal visit of Pope Francis was held here attended by more than 6 million people, making it the largest papal gathering in history.
- January 28, 2024 – The launching of Bagong Pilipinas campaign under President Bongbong Marcos was held here attended by 3,100 people.
- March 16, 2024 – The park was the site of the historic Guinness World Record for the largest human lung formation, with 5,596 participants attending an event to mark World Tuberculosis Day.
- January 13, 2025 – The National Rally for Peace led by the Iglesia ni Cristo was held here attended by 1.5 million people.
- September 21, 2025 – The Trillion Peso March and Baha sa Luneta were held in the park and other different locations to protest against alleged corruption in government flood control infrastructure projects.

=== Recurring events ===
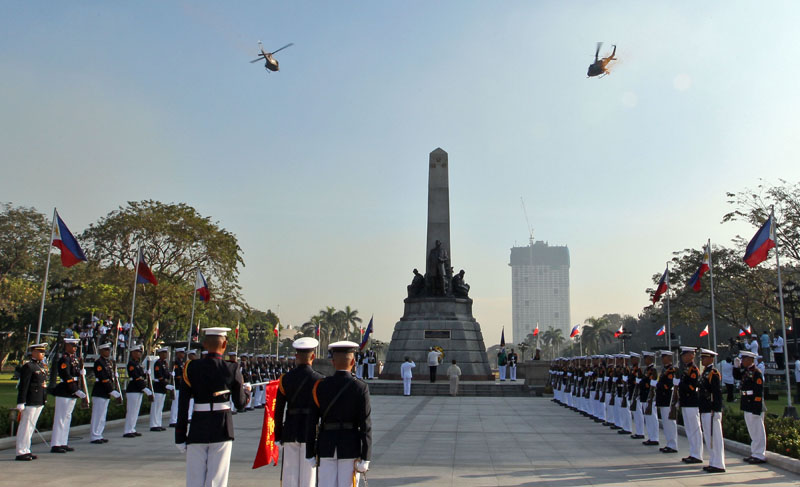
119th Rizal Day commemorations

- Monthly Flag-Raising Ceremony held every first Monday of the month at the Independence Flagpole for public – started October 2019.
- The annual celebration of Traslacion (January 9) is held at Quirino Grandstand and attended by millions of devotees.
- The annual Independence Day (June 12), Rizal Day (December 30) and New Year's Eve (December 31) celebrations are held at the park.
- The park was the traditional end of the Marlboro Tour (now known as the Tour de Filipinas), the national road bicycle racing event every April or May. Recently, the tour has ended in Baguio.
- The park is also the host of the National Milo Marathon.
- Presidential inaugurations are usually held in the park every June 30, six years starting from 1992. The most recent was the inauguration of Bongbong Marcos at the National Museum of Fine Arts in 2022.

== Management ==
Rizal Park is managed, developed, and administered by the National Parks Development Committee.

== Park layout ==
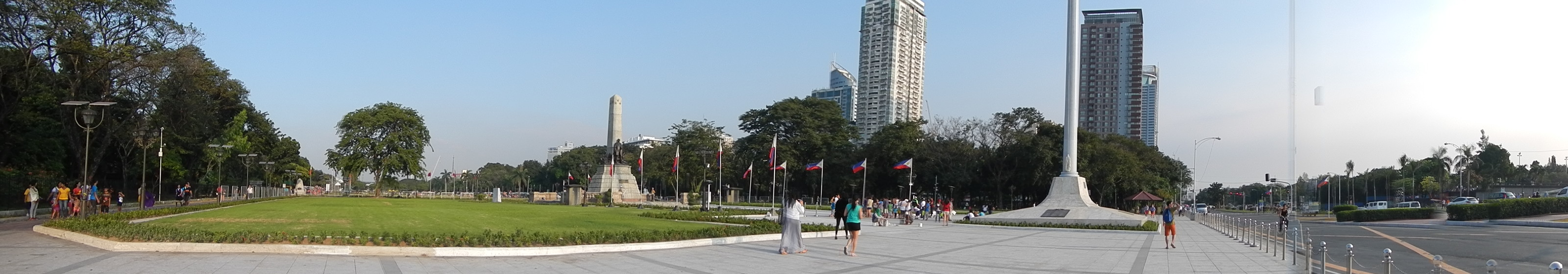
Panorama of the park along Roxas Boulevard

The park is divided into three sections:

- Northeastern Section: This 16-hectare (40-acre) section is designated as the National Museum Complex which includes the Agrifina Circle, and where the National Museum of Natural History and the National Museum of Anthropology are located.
- Central Section: Located south of Maria Orosa Street is the 22-hectare (54-acre) park proper that extends down up to Roxas Boulevard. This is where the Rizal Monument and several attractions such as the Open-Air Auditorium, Independence Flagpole, Central Musical and Dancing Fountain are located.
- Southwestern Section: Includes the Burnham Green, a 10-hectare (25-acre) open field, the Quirino Grandstand and the Manila Ocean Park along Manila Bay.

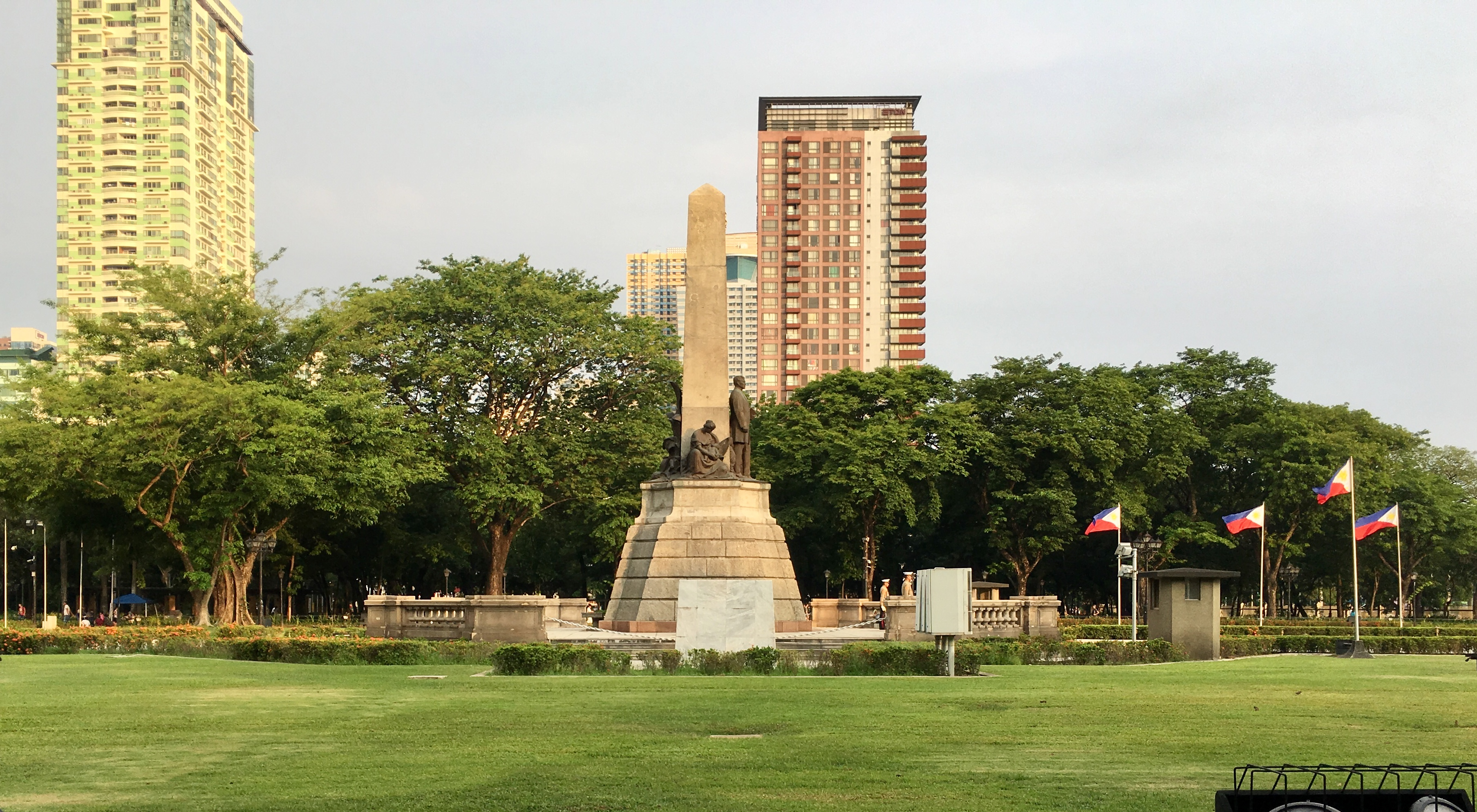
Jose Rizal's Monument in Luneta

Location of buildings in and around Rizal Park
N W E S
Northeastern side
Northwestern side		Southeastern side
National Museum of Anthropology	Agrifina Circle and the Sentinel of Freedom	National Museum of Natural History
Japanese Garden	Rizal Monument	National Library of the Philippines
Intramuros	Rizal Monument	National Historical Commission of the Philippines
Manila Hotel	Quirino Grandstand	Museo Pambata, formerly the Manila Elks Club
Southwestern side

=== Gardens ===
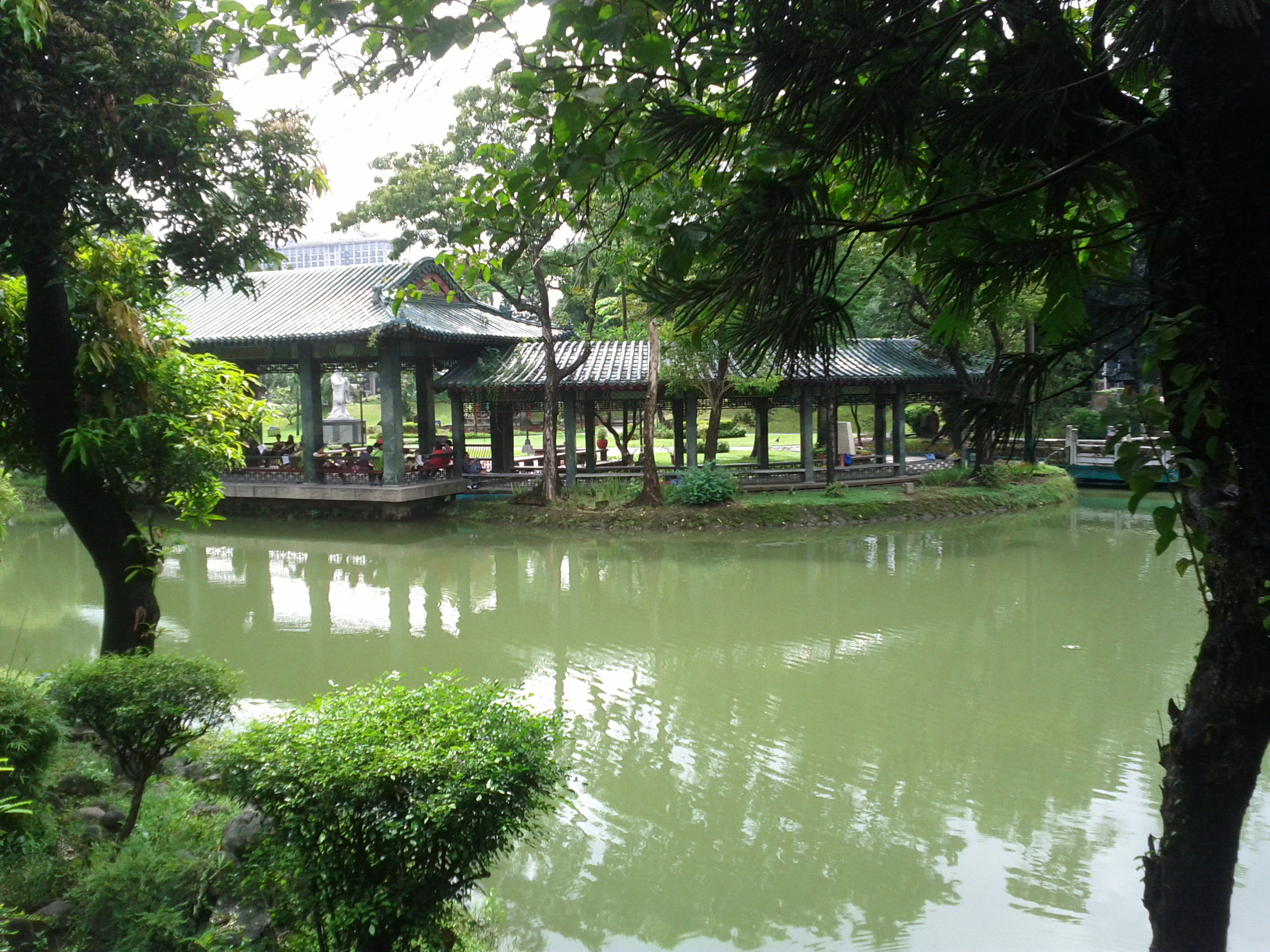
Inside the Chinese Garden

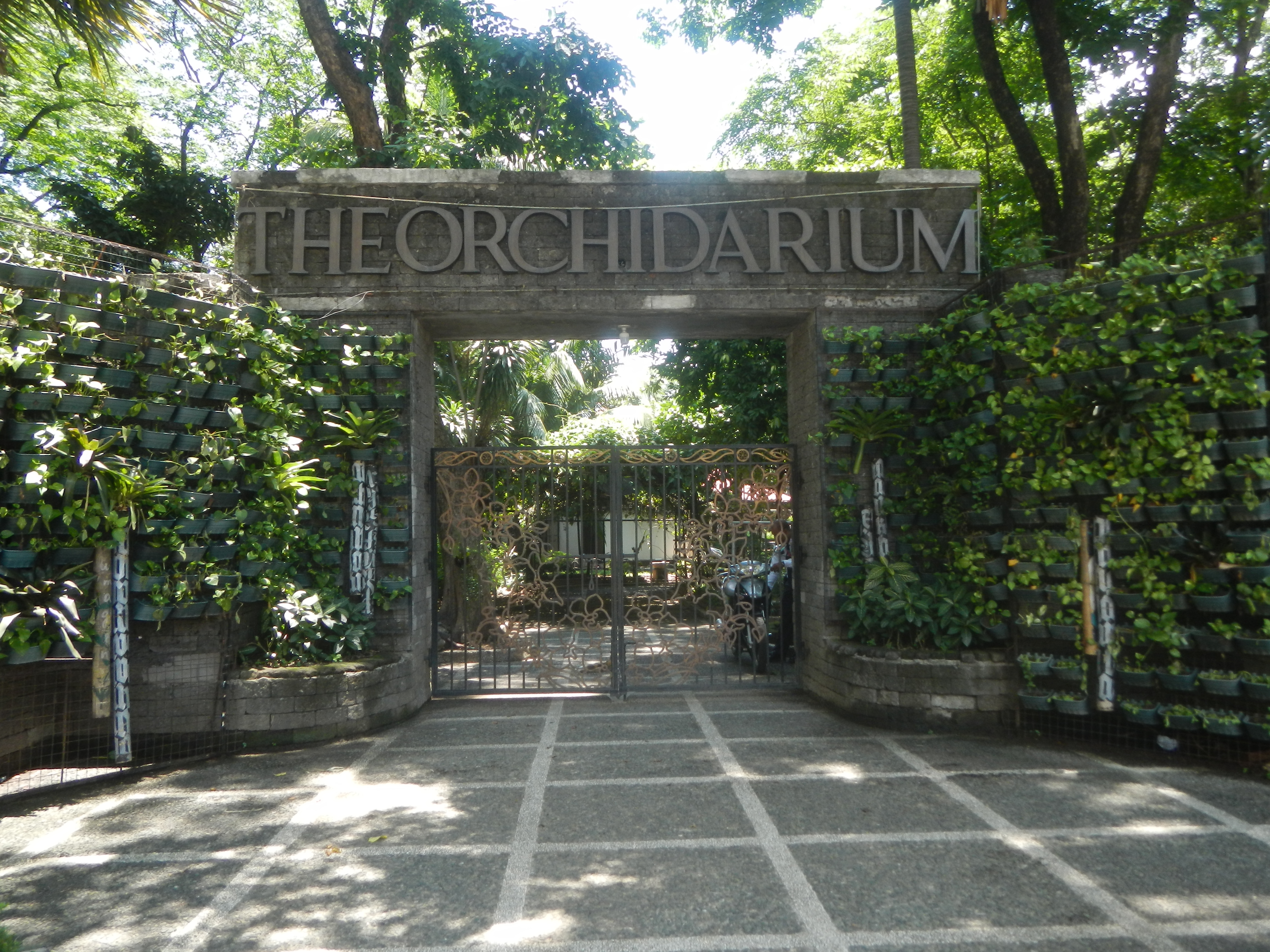
The Orchidarium

- Children's Playground, the section of the park built for kids, is located at the southeastern corner of Rizal Park. The playground was also renovated in 2011.
- Chinese Garden. An ornate Chinese-style gate, carved with swirling dragons, leads you into this whimsical garden which looks like it has been transported from old Peking. Along the lagoon constructed to simulate a small lake, are pagodas and gazebos that are set off by red pillars and green-tiled roofs and decorated with a profusion of mythical figures.
- Japanese Garden. The gardens were built to promote friendship between Japan and the Philippines. Inside is nice place for pleasant walks around the Japanese style gardens, lagoon and bridge.
- Noli me Tangere Garden, recently unveiled, It features the Heidelberg fountain where Rizal used to drink from when he was staying in Germany. It was donated as a symbol of Filipino-German friendship, The bust of Ferdinand Blumentritt can be found in the garden.
- Orchidarium and Butterfly Pavilion, established in 1994, was a former parking lot developed into a one-hectare rainforest-like park. The Orchidarium showcases Philippines' rich collection of orchid species and butterflies. The pavilion is a favorite venue for weddings.

=== Event venues ===
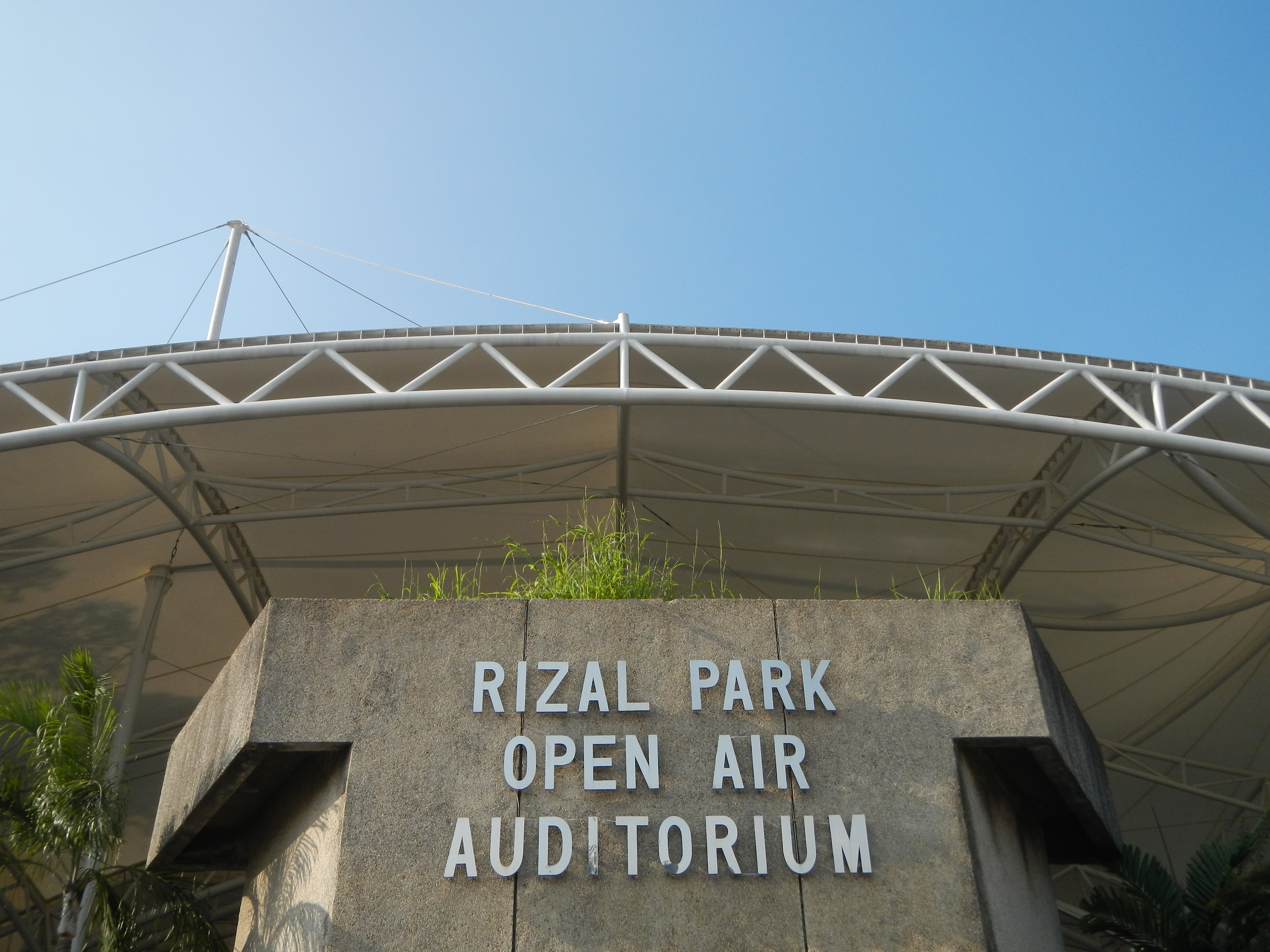
The Open-Air Auditorium

- Open-Air Auditorium, designed by national artist for architecture, Leandro Locsin, features performances provided for free to the general public by the National Parks Development Committee, Department of Tourism and People's Television. Free entertainment is also provided elsewhere in the park. Featured shows are a mix of performances from dance, theatre, to musical performances by local and foreign artists. This is also the venue for the Cinema in the Open-Air, which provides free showings of critically acclaimed films.
- Quirino Grandstand, Originally called grand Independence Grandstand. It was designed by architect Juan M. Arellano, in preparation for the proclamation of Independence on July 4, 1946, and to avoid overcrowding in front of the Legislative Building during the inauguration of the Third Philippine Republic. It was designed in Neoclassical style. However, in 1949 Federico Illustre, chief architect at the Bureau of Public Works, modified some designs of Arellano. It was completed on the reclaimed area along Manila Bay where President Elpidio Quirino was sworn in after winning the presidential election. Since then, newly elected Presidents of the Philippines traditionally take their oath of office and deliver their inaugural address to the nation in the grandstand, which was later renamed after President Quirino. Many important political, cultural and religious events in the post-war era have been held here.

- Parade grounds and the Burnham Green, Parade grounds are a popular venue for fun runs, races, motorcades and parades. The Burnham Green, named after American architect Daniel Burnham is a large open space in front of the Quirino grandstand, designed to accommodate large crowd gatherings at the park, It also serves as picnic grounds and venue for different sports activities. The Narra tree planted by Pope Paul VI and the bronze statue of San Lorenzo Ruiz that was given by Pope John Paul II can be found in this area.

- Valor's Hall/Bulwagan ng Kagitingan, situated at the light and sound complex, Its artistic landscape and design made it one of the top-pick venues for event and cocktail receptions.

=== Educational establishments ===
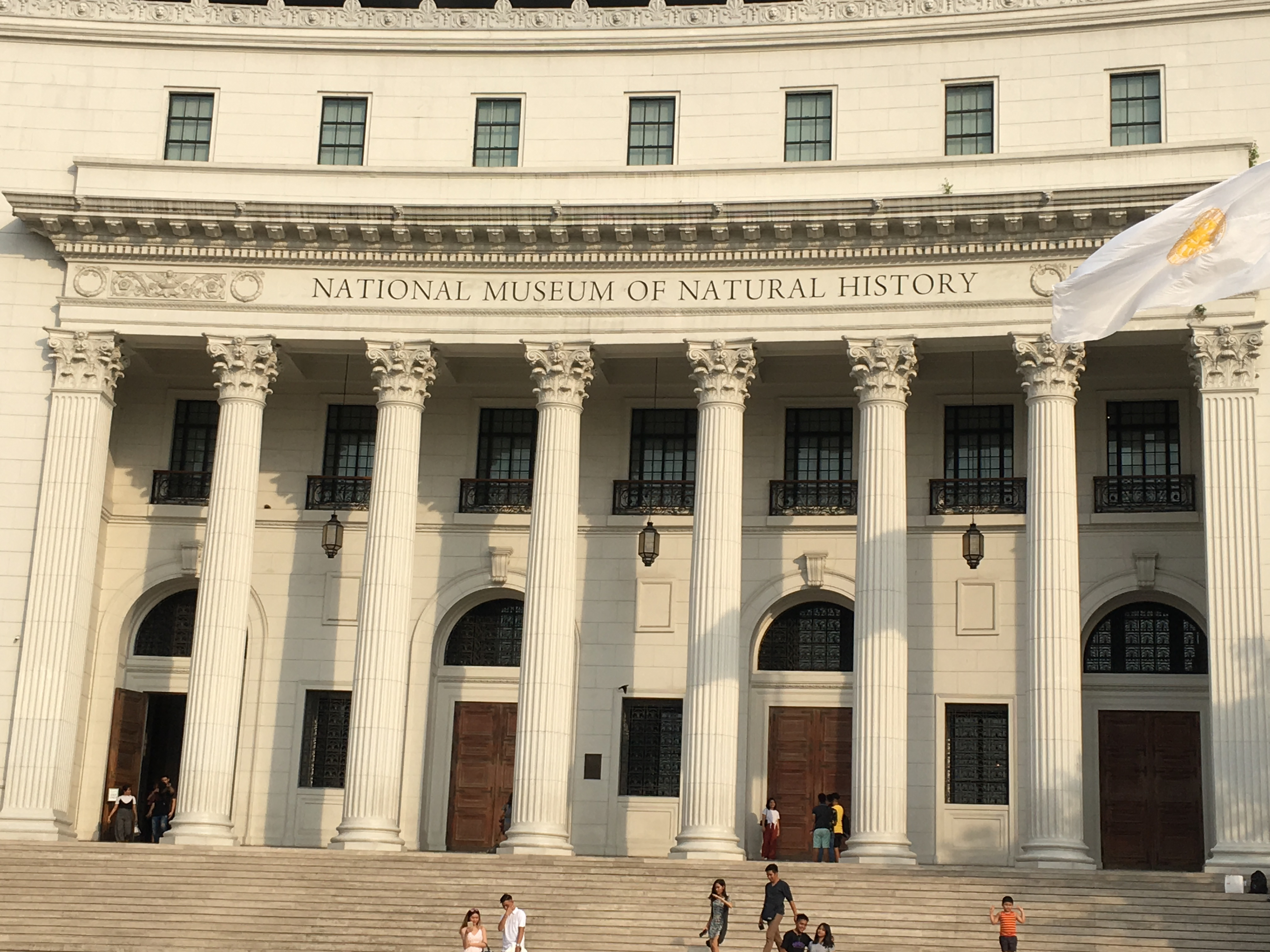
National Museum of Natural History

- National Planetarium
- National Museum of Natural History
- National Museum of Anthropology, in the building north of Agrifina Circle, are the Anthropology and Archeology collections of the National Museum of the Philippines.
- National Library of the Philippines is the country's premier public library. The library has a history of its own and its rich Filipiniana collections are maintained by the librarians to preserve the institution as the nation's fountain of local knowledge and source of information for thousands of students and everyday users in their research and studies.
- National Museum of Fine Arts, located on the northeastern tip of Rizal Park, is an art museum of the National Museum of the Philippines.
- Manila Ocean Park is an oceanarium located in the westernmost part of Luneta behind the Quirino Grandstand and along Manila Bay. The complex opened on March 1, 2008.

=== Artworks and monuments ===
==== Rizal Monument ====
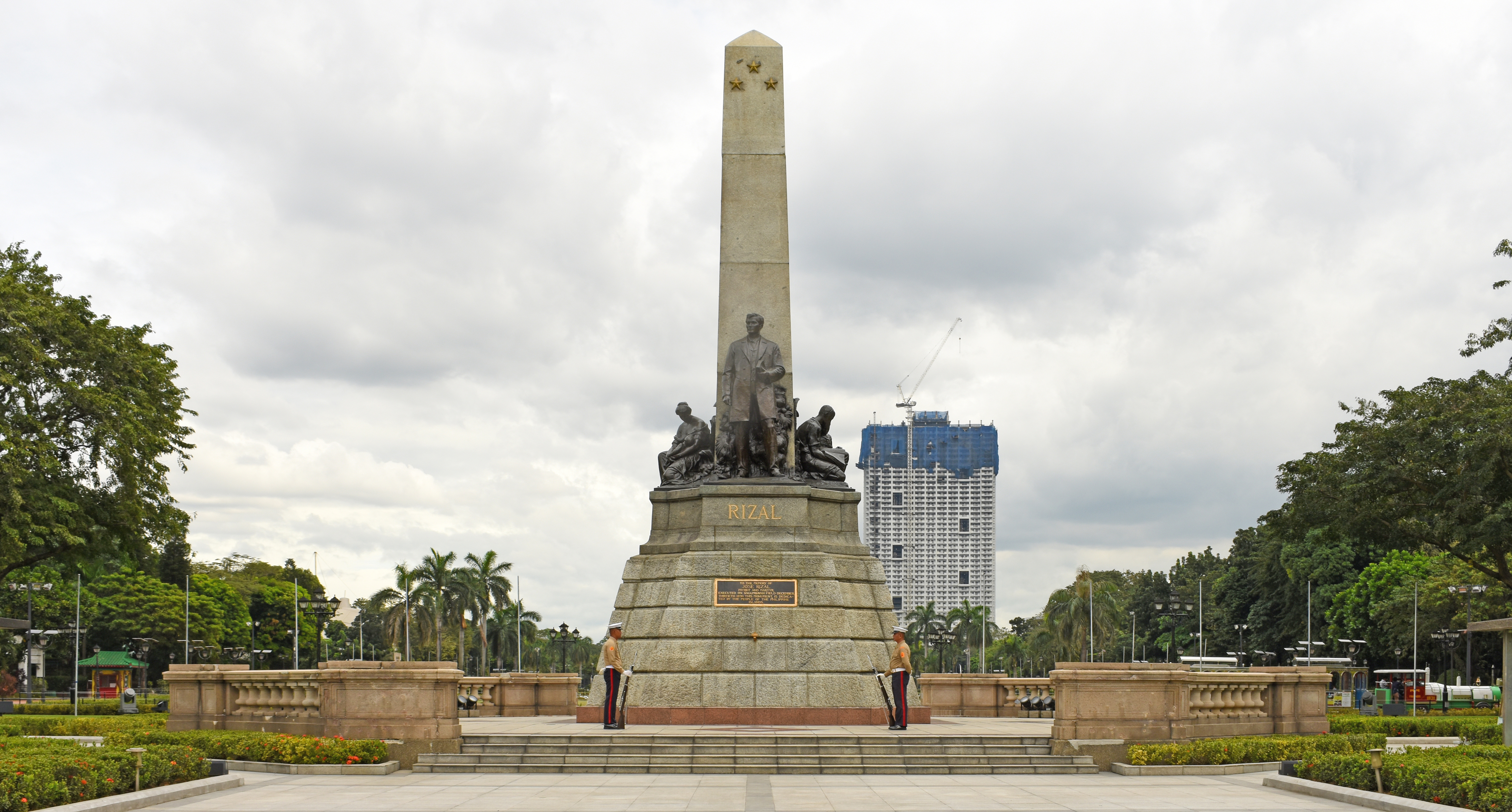
Rizal Monument

The bronze-and-granite Rizal monument is among the most famous sculptural landmarks in the country. It is almost protocol for visiting dignitaries to lay a wreath at the monument. Located on the monument is not merely the statue of Rizal, but also his remains.

On September 28, 1901, the United States Philippine Commission approved Act No. 243, which would erect a monument in Luneta to commemorate the memory of José Rizal, Filipino patriot, writer and poet. The committee formed by the act held an international design competition between 1905 and 1907 and invited sculptors from Europe and the United States to submit entries with an estimated cost of ₱100,000 using local materials.

The first-prize winner was Carlos Nicoli of Carrara, Italy for his scaled plaster model titled "Al Martir de Bagumbayan" (To the Martyr of Bagumbayan), besting 40 other accepted entries. The contract though, was awarded to second-placer Swiss sculptor named Richard Kissling for his "Motto Stella" (Guiding Star).

After more than twelve years of its approval, the shrine was finally unveiled on December 30, 1913, during Rizal's 17th death anniversary. His poem Mi último adiós ("My Last Farewell") is inscribed on the memorial plaque. The site is continuously guarded by ceremonial soldiers of Philippine Marine Corps’ Marine Security and Escort Group

==== Others ====
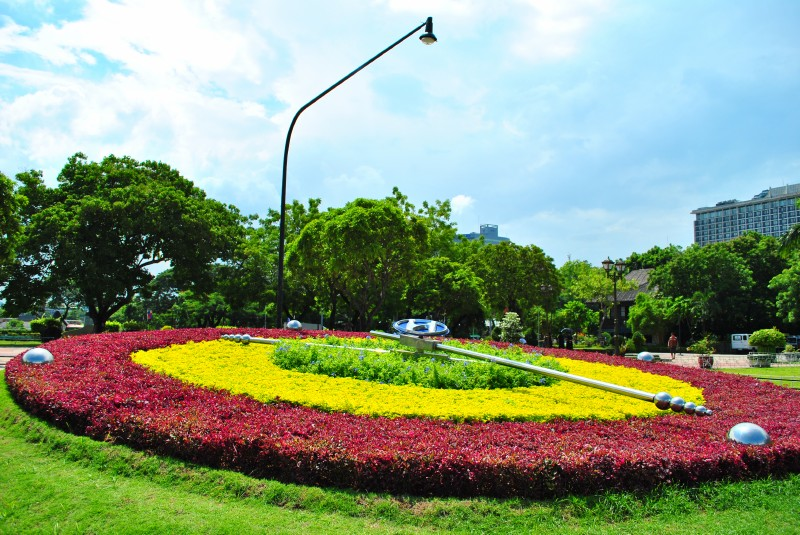
Flower Clock

- Artist's Haven/Kanlungan ng Sining. A site of artistic and natural artworks, It houses the gallery run by the Arts Association of the Philippines (AAP), in collaboration with the NDPC.
- Artworks in the Park. The Rizal park features different artworks of some renowned Filipino artists:

- Dancing Rings. A replica of Joe Datuin's Dancing Rings, the original sculpture is the Grand Prize winner of the 2008 International Olympic Committee Sports and Arts Contest in Lausanne, Switzerland.
- The New Filipino/Ang Bagong Pinoy. A sculpture by Joe Dautin, it features intertwined rings that resemble a human figure that represents a new Filipino.
- Ang Pagbabago (The Change) Mosaic Murals. It represents the Filipino ideals of peace, love, unity and prosperity. It serves as a call to national renewal and change.

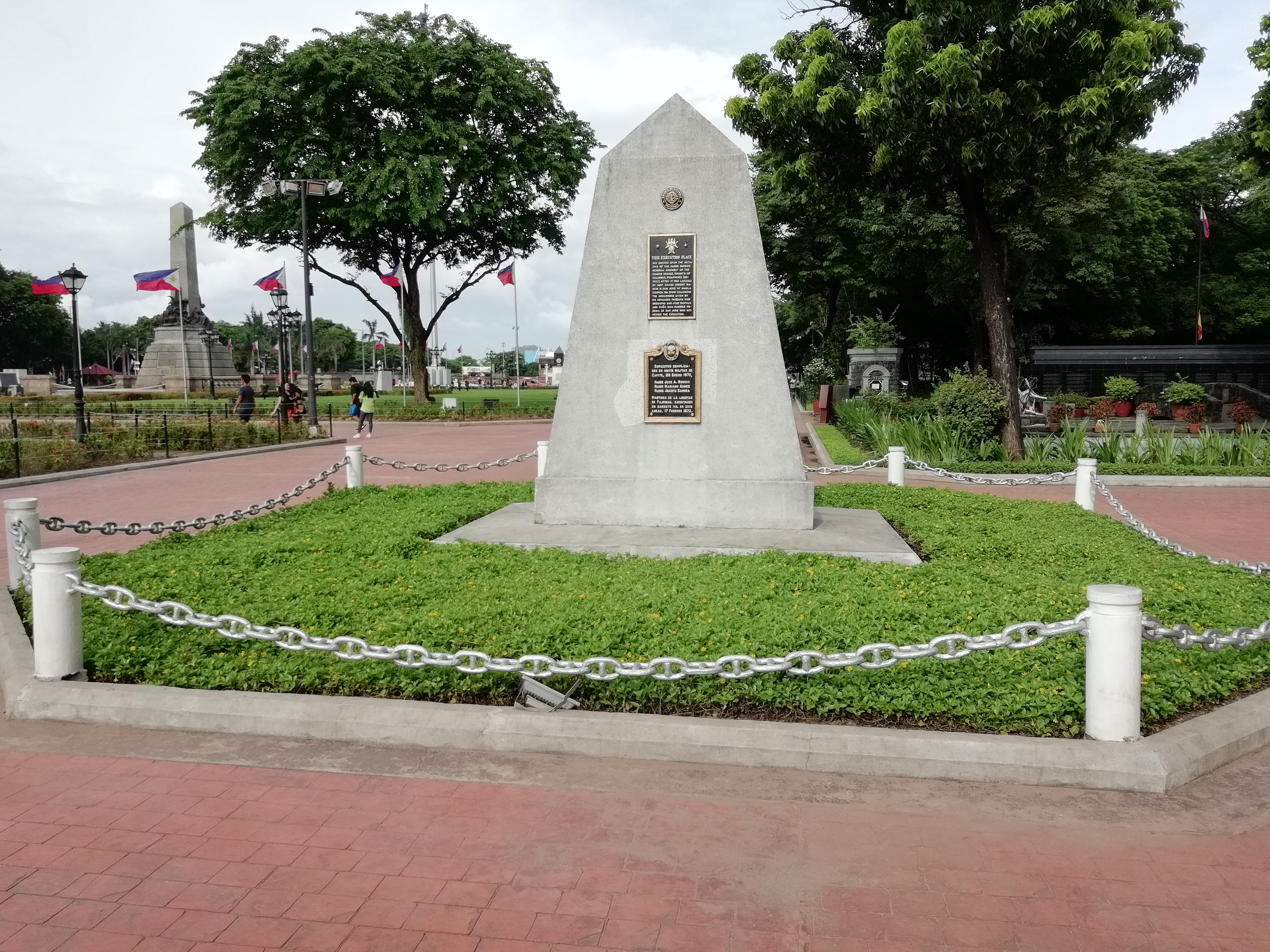
Execution place obelisk of Gomburza

- Execution place of Gomburza. An obelisk memorial to the place where the three priest-martyrs Gomburza was executed via garrote. A plaque from the Knights of Columbus in English and a Spanish National Historical Institute Historical marker is also attached.
- Diorama of Rizal's Martyrdom. On an area north of Rizal monument stands a set of statues depicting Rizal's execution, situated on the spot where he was actually martyred, contrary to popular belief that the monument is the spot where he was executed. In the evenings, a light & sound presentation titled "The Martyrdom of Dr. Jose Rizal" features a multimedia dramatization of the last poignant minutes of the life of the Filipino patriot. Rizal's poem Mi Ultimo Adios, engraved in black granite, can also be found here.
- Filipino-Korean Soldier Monument. This monument of two Filipino soldiers aiding a Korean soldier is dedicated to the Filipino combat soldiers who fought with the Korean troops during the Korean War.

- Soul waves. It represents sea waves as a tribute to Filipinos who died during the World War II, It is placed in the park by Korea, as a sign of mutual respect.

- The Flower Clock. It features a clock on a flower bed. A feature of the park since the 1960s, it was restored in 2011. The clock's hand was sculpted by Filipino artist Jose Datuin.
- The Gallery of Heroes. This is a row of bust sculpture monuments of historical Philippine Heroes. There are 2 rows on both sides of the Central Lagoon, one row on the North Promenade and another row on the South Promenade
- Statue of the Sentinel of Freedom (or the Lapu-Lapu Monument). The monument was a gift from the people of Korea as appreciation and to honor the memory of freedom-loving Filipinos who helped during the Korean War in the early 1950s (as inscribed in the plaque). Lapu-Lapu was a native Visayan chieftain in Mactan, Cebu and representative of the Sultan of Sulu, and is now known as the first native of the archipelago to resist Spanish colonization. He is retroactively regarded as the first hero of the Philippines. On the morning of April 27, 1521, Lapu-Lapu and the men of Mactan, armed with spears and kampilan, faced Spanish soldiers led by Portuguese captain Ferdinand Magellan in what would later be known as the Battle of Mactan. Magellan and several of his men were killed.

==== Former ====
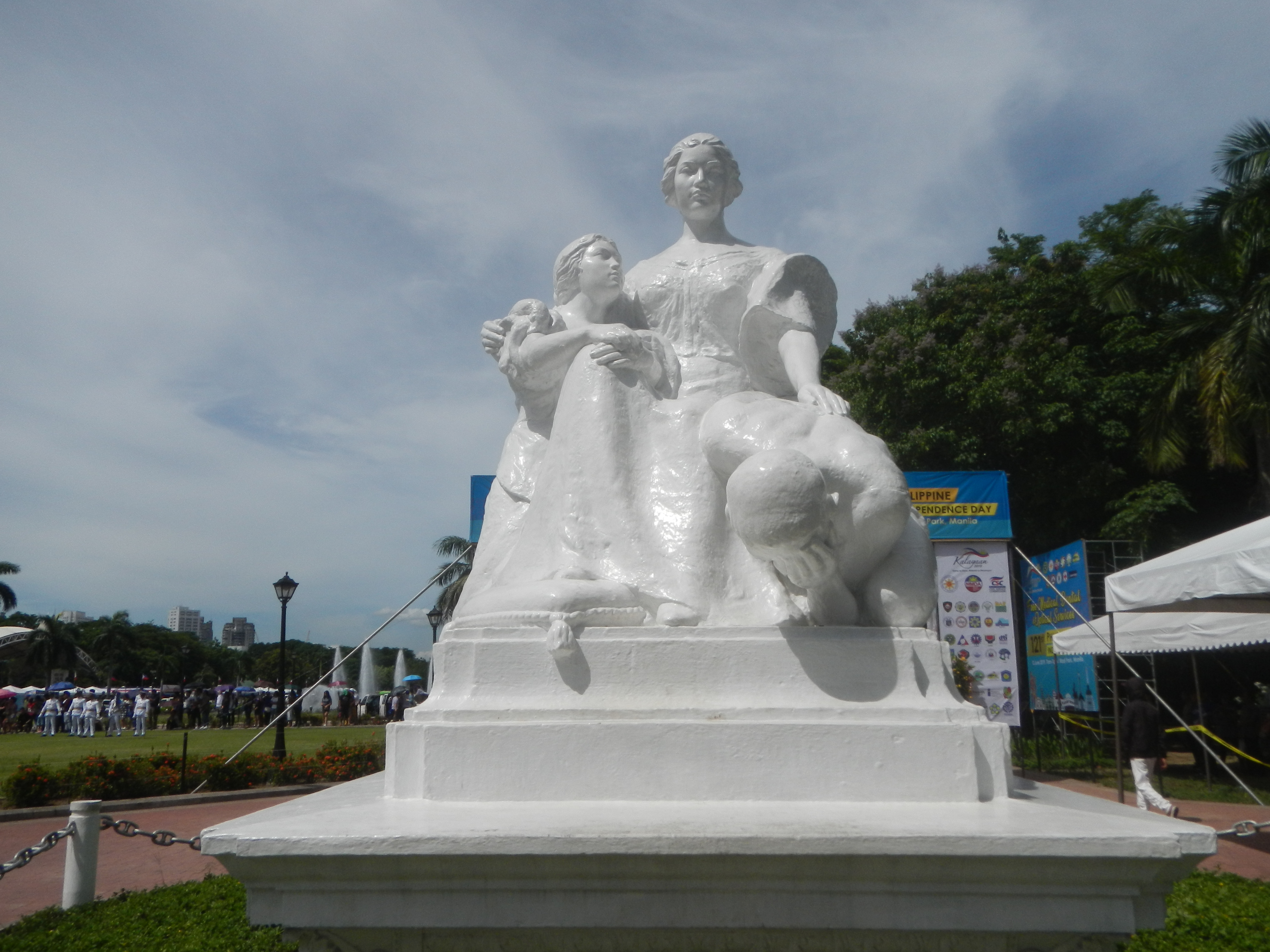
La Madre Filipina sculpture in Rizal Park before it was transferred back to Jones Bridge

- La Madre Filipina. The sculpture was transferred back to its original site in Jones Bridge in November 2019 after 73 years of staying at the Park. Its plinths were reconstructed using the original neoclassic design during the 2019 redevelopment of the bridge.
- Relief map of the Philippines. Built in the 1960s and designed by Filipino sculptor Jose M. Mendoza, this was a giant raised-relief map of the country, including the Scarborough Shoal, Kalayaan, and eastern part of Sabah, in the middle of a small man-made lake. It was demolished by the National Museum of the Philippines in 2023 as it would be replaced by an exhibition hall.

=== Other features ===
- Independence Flagpole, standing at 105 feet (32 m), is the highest flagpole in the Philippines. On this spot in front of Rizal Monument, at 9:15 am July 4, 1946, the full independence of the Republic of the Philippines was proclaimed as authorized by United States President Harry S. Truman. As of August 2013, the flagpole was restored and increased its height to 150 feet (46 m). The government is expected to spend ₱7.8 million, in preparation for the centennial of Rizal Monument
- Kilometer Zero is located within the Park on Roxas Boulevard, in front of the Rizal Monument. It serves as the point from which all road distances from Manila are measured.
- Musical Dancing Fountain, built in 1968, is deemed as the biggest and most vibrant dancing fountain in the country. Its central lagoon presents a show with waters soaring up to 88 feet (27 m), fireballs, exploding water rockets, laser music, and peacock spray water screens, with OPM and pop as background music. It was also renovated in 2011.
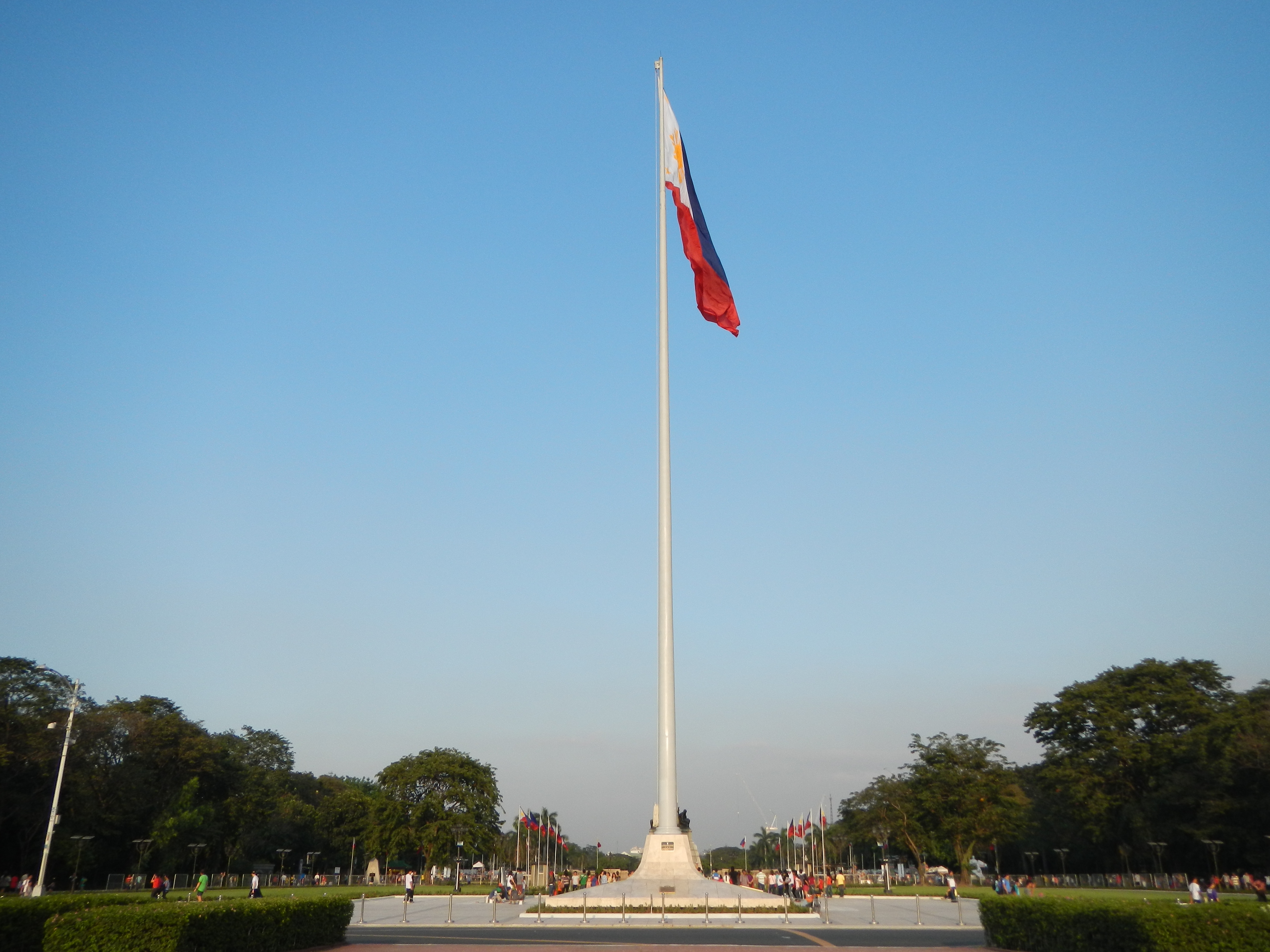
Independence Flagpole

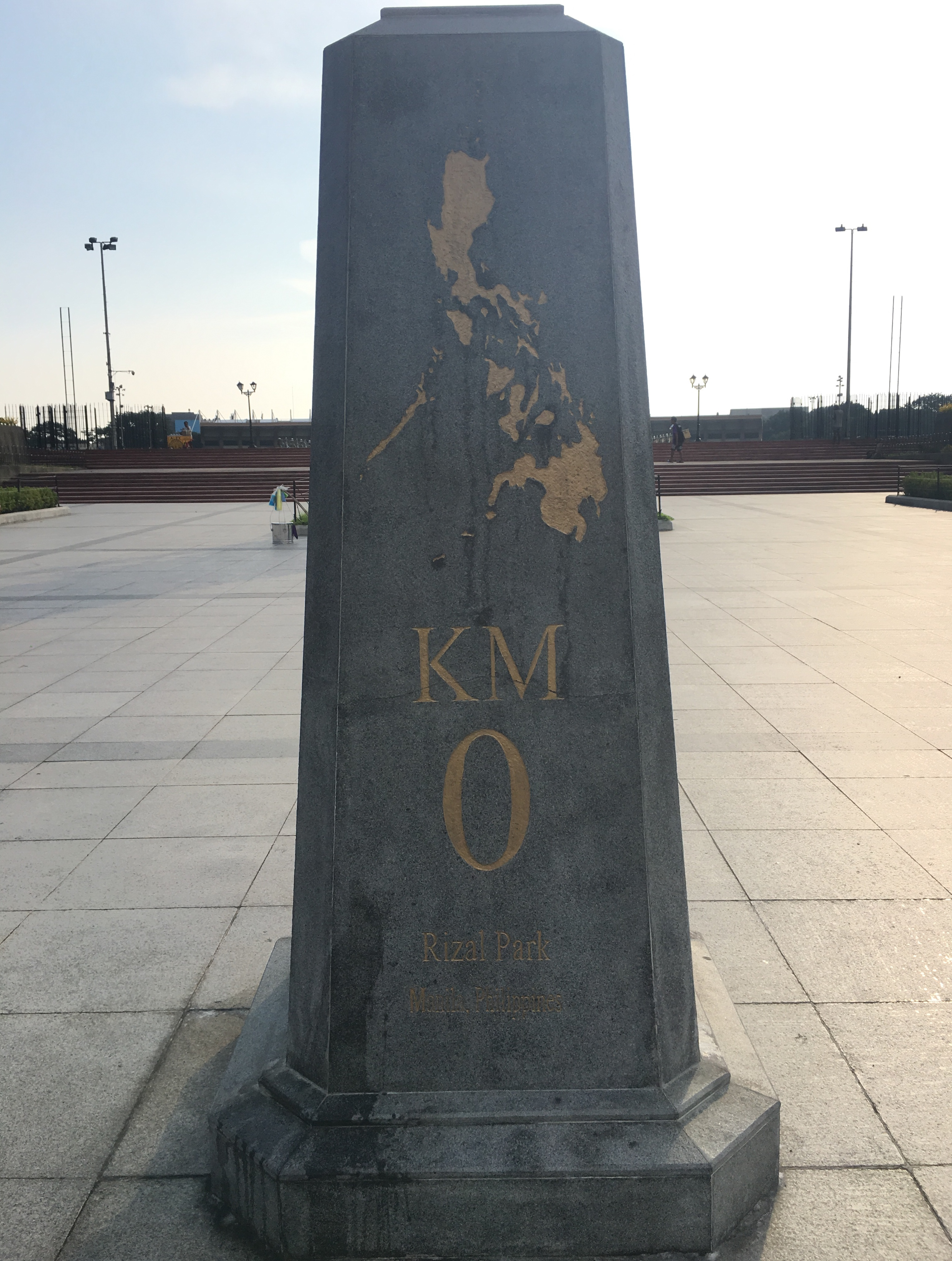
Kilometer Zero

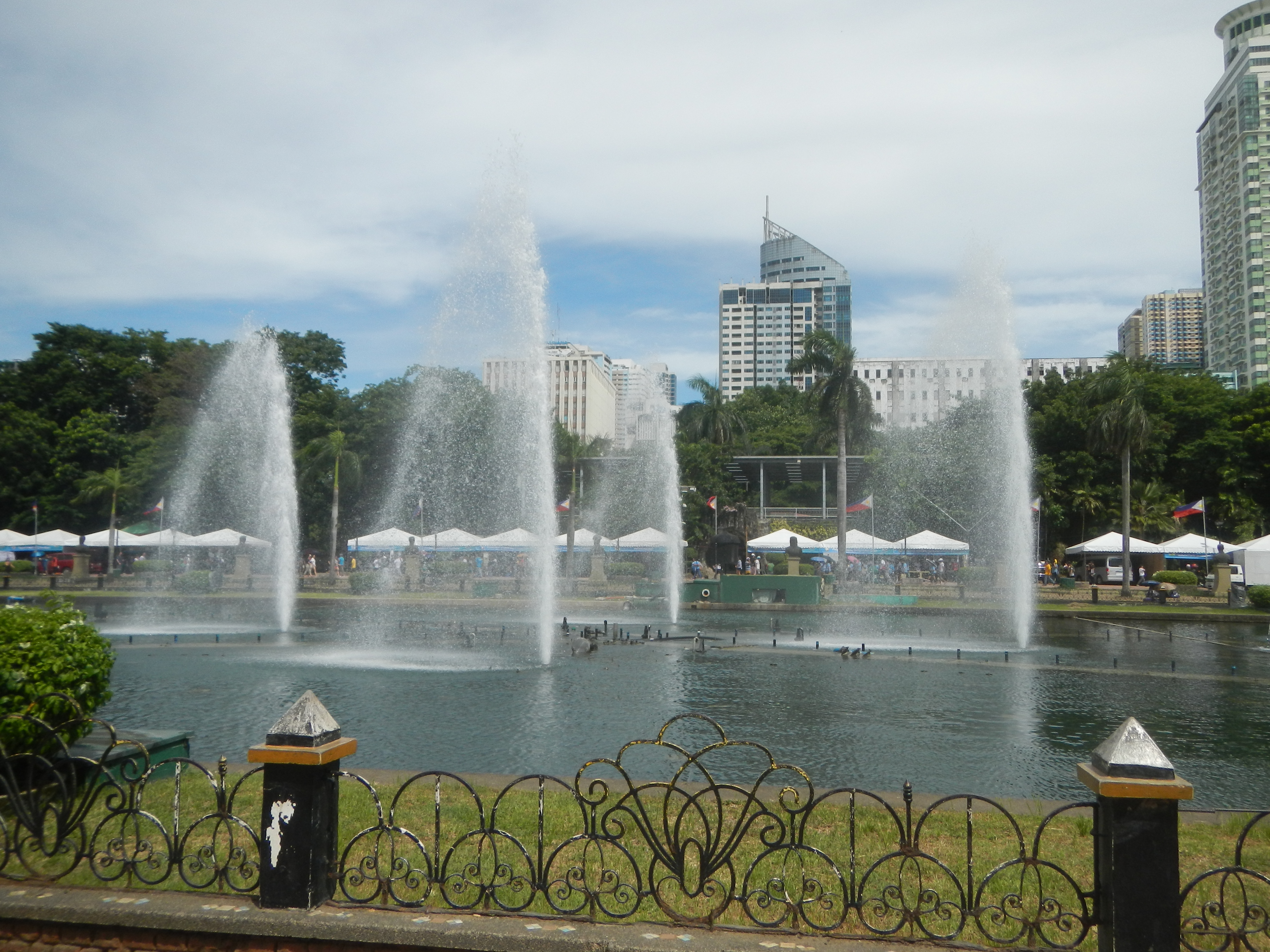
Musical Dancing Fountain

== Flora ==
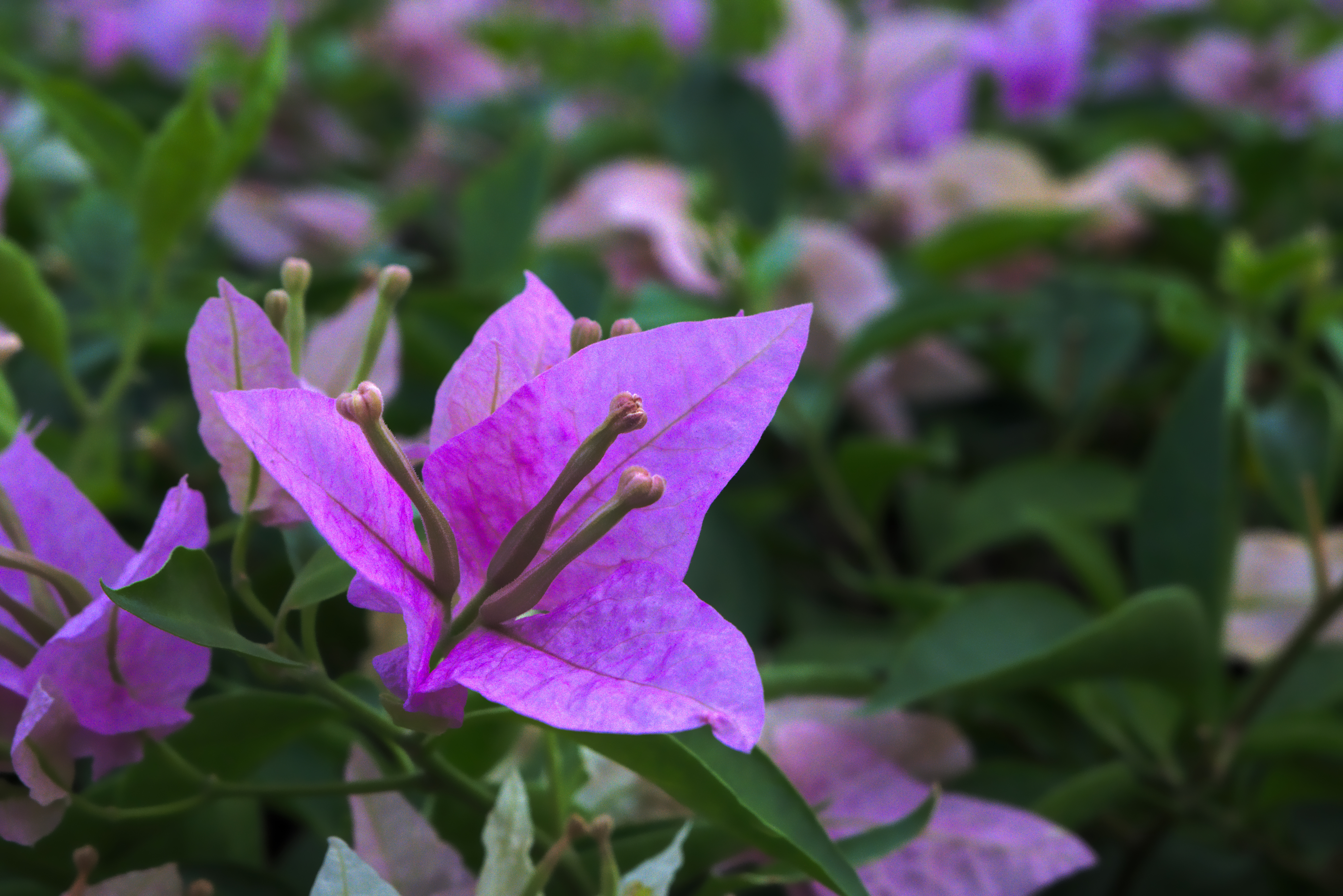
Pink Bougainvillea in Rizal Park

According to an inventory made by the National Parks Development Committee, there are 3,497 trees in Rizal Park belonging to 112 species as of 2015. 527 of the individual trees are narra.

== Security ==
In 2012, 30 high-definition closed-circuit television (CCTV) cameras were installed to make the area safer for local and foreign tourists. The National Parks Development Committee has stationed police and security officers in key places in the park for added security.

== In popular culture ==
- The Amazing Race 5, the fifth installment of the American reality television show The Amazing Race, featured the Rizal Monument at the start of Leg 12. The park was revisited again 27 installments later on The Amazing Race 32 with Lapu Lapu Circle serving as the starting and finishing point of the tenth leg.
- The Port Malaya patch in Ragnarok Online, a massively multiplayer online role-playing game (MMOPPG), features a replica of the Rizal Monument as one of the town's attractions.
- HaMerotz LaMillion 8, the eighth installment of the Israeli version of The Amazing Race, concluded at Rizal Park.

== Rizal Parks elsewhere ==
Similar to Rizal Avenues and Rizal Streets, which are often the main streets in Philippine towns and cities, many cities and municipalities in the Philippines also have a park named "Rizal Park" or "Plaza Rizal", often serving as the town or city plaza and featuring a monument to José Rizal.

Seattle also has its own Dr. Jose Rizal Park.

In 2019, a monument to José Rizal was installed in a park referred to as Luneta Park in Markham, Ontario, Canada, along its own Rizal Avenue.

== See also ==
- Jose Rizal
- Rizal Monument
- Paco Park
