= Sentinel of Freedom =

Monument to Lapu-Lapu in Manila, Philippines

- The statue in 2026 along Maria Orosa Street, facing the Rizal Monument
- Interactive map of Sentinel of Freedom
- Location: Rizal Park, Manila
- Coordinates: 14°35′02″N 120°58′50″E
- Designer: Juan Sajid Imao
- Material: Bronze
- Height: 12.19 meters (40.0 ft) (including 3.05-meter (10.0 ft) pedestal)
- Opening date: February 5, 2004
- Dedicated to: Lapulapu

The Sentinel of Freedom is a monument to Lapulapu located at the eastern portion of Rizal Park in Manila, Philippines.

== History ==
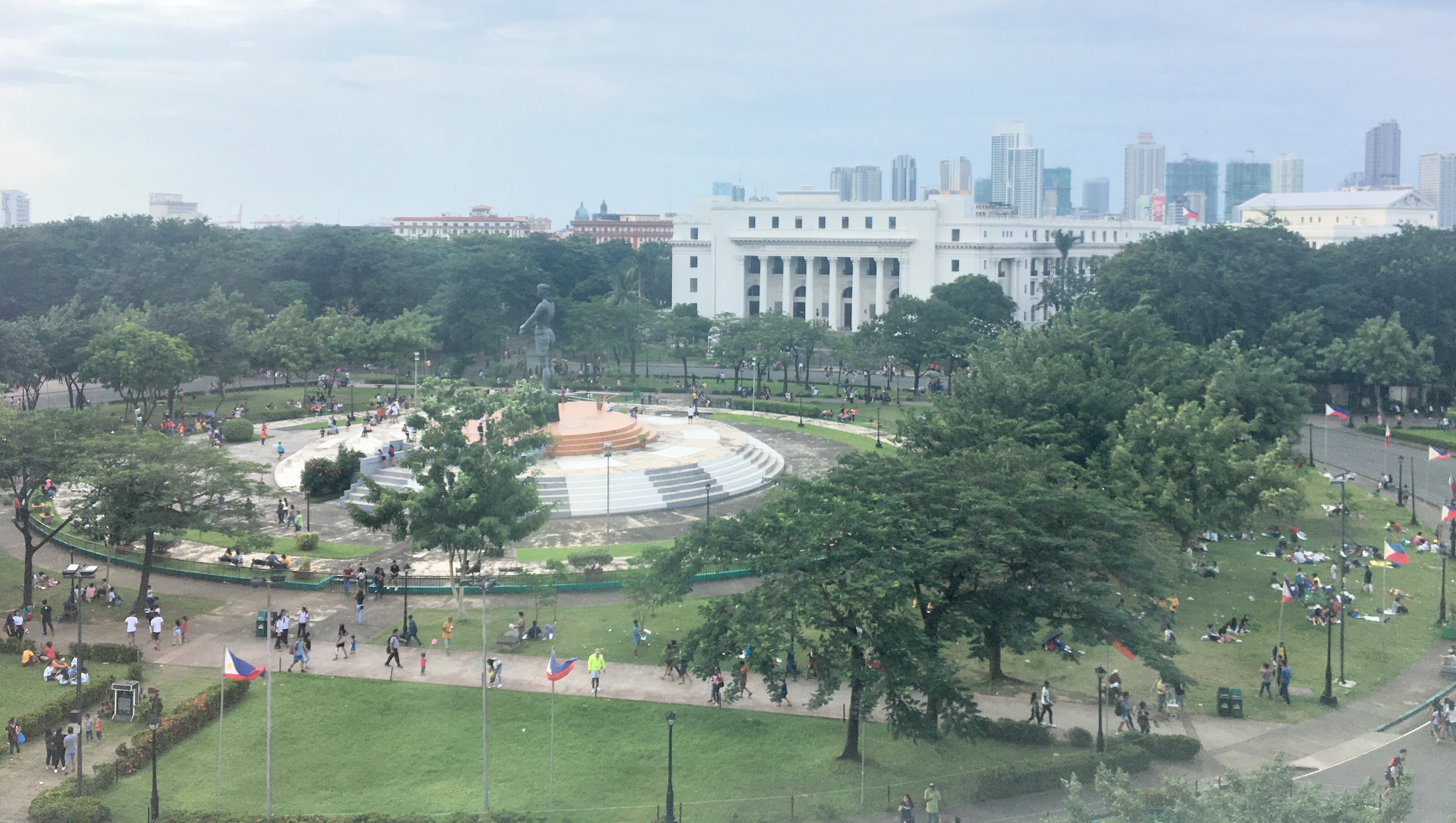
Aerial view of the Agrifina Circle, where the Statue of the Sentinel of Freedom was previously centered.

In 2004, Representatives Raul del Mar (Cebu City 1st District) and Nerissa Corazon Soon-Ruiz (Cebu 6th District) initiated a proposal to install a statue of Lapulapu in Rizal Park as a move to honor him as a hero not only of Cebu but of the whole Philippines. They urged the Office of the President to accept their proposal. Then-Tourism Secretary Richard Gordon, who was a 2004 senatorial candidate, supported the installation of the statue. The project was opposed by the National Historical Institute (NHI) led by Ambeth Ocampo, which insisted that only statues of heroes of the Philippine Revolution could be erected in the Agrifina Circle.

The statue was unveiled on February 5, 2004, despite opposition from the NHI, after then-President Gloria Macapagal Arroyo approved the project. The Korean Freedom League led by Chairman Kwon Jung-dal donated ₱15 million for the casting of the statue. The statue was temporarily dismantled from the Agrifina Circle in mid-2004, which was met with opposition, including from the local government of Lapu-Lapu City at that time.

In 2014, Lapu-Lapu City Mayor Paz Radaza requested the transfer of the statue to Punta Engaño in her city, where she planned to place it on an artificial island to be constructed at the tip of the locality. This proposal arose after Radaza met with Tourism Secretary Ramon Jimenez Jr., during which the National Historical Institute's (NHI) opinion that the statue could "desecrate" Rizal Park was raised. The move was opposed by Representative Raul del Mar, who said that the move would be detrimental and would cause a “loss of honor and recognition” to the province of Cebu and Lapulapu.

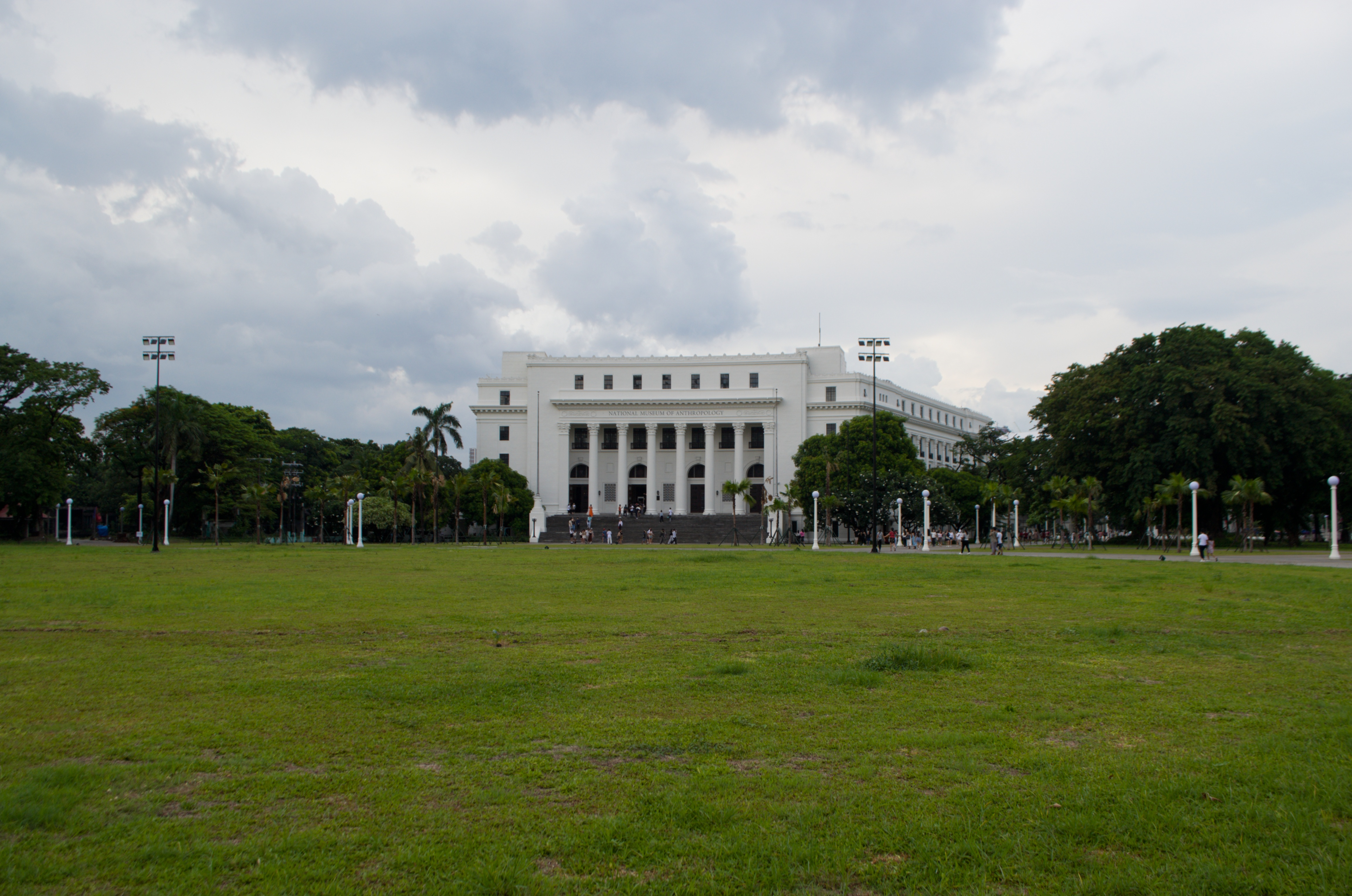
The Agrifina Circle in June 2024. Note the absence of the statue and its podium.

In July 2023, the statue was taken under the care of the National Museum of the Philippines and was dismantled for “restoration and re-erection,” amid the redevelopment of the park's eastern section. The re-erection project was completed in August 2024, with the statue now facing the Rizal Monument.

== Design and symbolism ==
The Sentinel of Freedom was designed by sculptor Juan Sajid Imao. The monument is composed of a 12.19-meter (40.0 ft) bronze statue atop a 3.05-meter (10.0 ft) pedestal. Imao noted that his work on the statue sought to portray Lapulapu as a strong and peace-loving man who was also ready to defend himself against those who threatened his freedom. Lapulapu is portrayed not in a fighting stance but rather standing guard, holding a kampilan sheathed in a scabbard and planted in the ground.

Then-Tourism Undersecretary Oscar Palabyab chose to create a statue for Lapulapu not primarily due to his victory over Ferdinand Magellan but for the value he represented in history.

The distance between the statue and the Rizal Monument, which is dedicated to Jose Rizal, was 400 feet (120 m), representing the "400-year gap" between Lapulapu and Rizal. According to Gordon, Lapulapu represents the Muslims and Rizal represents the Tagalog Christians in Philippine history.

The statue, which was also donated by the Korean Freedom League, was a gift in recognition of Filipinos who fought for South Korea in the Korean War.

== See also ==
- Lapu-Lapu Shrine
