= Agrifina Circle =

Road junction in Manila, Philippines

- Teodoro F. Valencia Circle
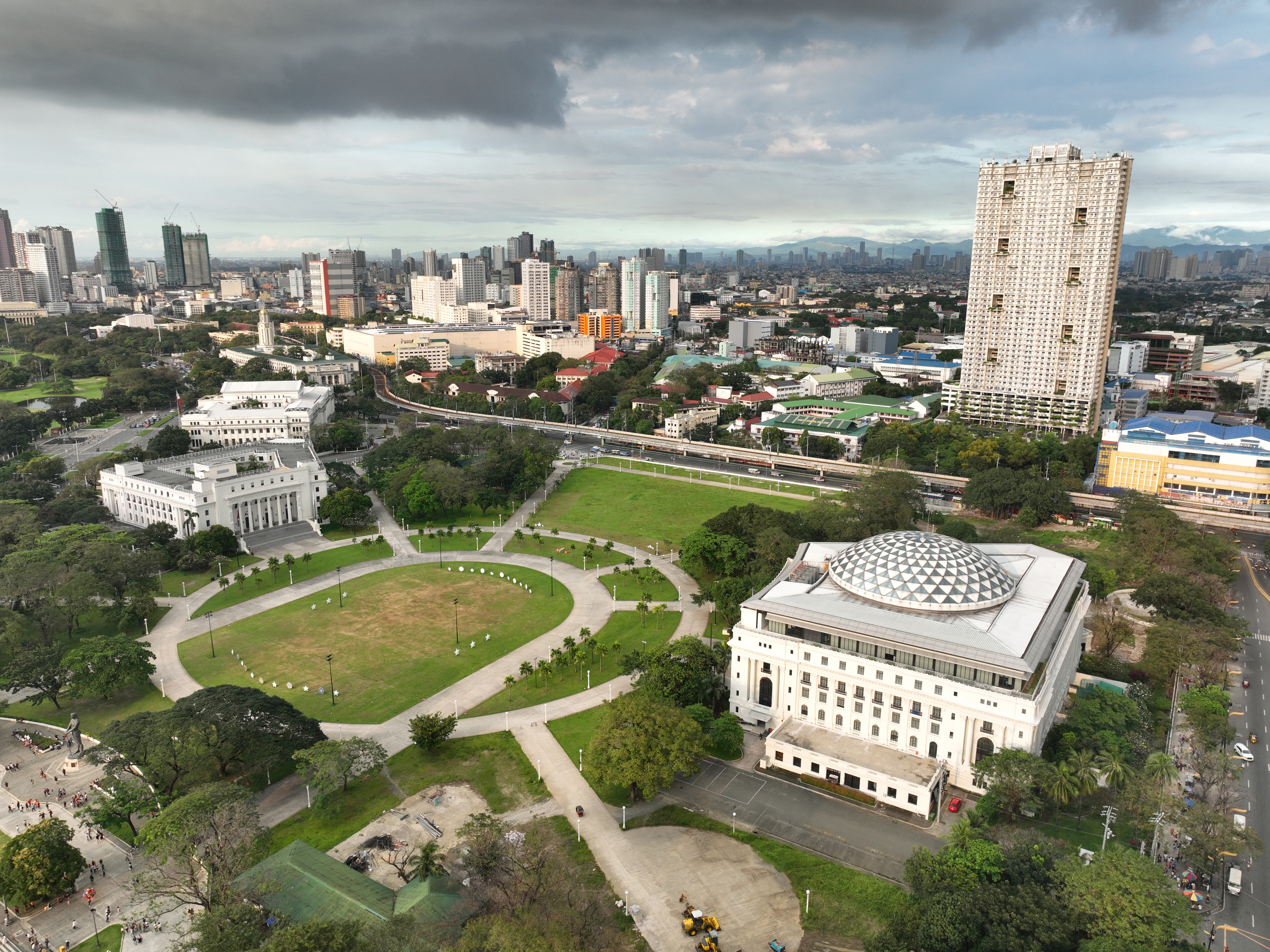
- Drone view of the circle in 2026
- Interactive map of Agrifina Circle

Location
- Rizal Park, Ermita, Manila, Philippines
- Roads at junction: General Luna Street; Minor roads inside Rizal Park

Construction
- Type: Traffic circle
- Maintained by: Department of Public Works and Highways - South Manila District Engineering Office

The Agrifina Circle, officially the Teodoro F. Valencia Circle, is a traffic circle within the eastern portion of Rizal Park in Manila, Philippines. It has a diameter of 42 meters (138 ft).

== Etymology ==
The name "Agrifina" is a portmanteau of the words "Agriculture" and "Finance" since two neoclassical buildings located on opposite ends of the circle formerly housed the Departments of Agriculture and Finance. The former building of the Department of Finance formerly housed the Department of Tourism until 2015, when the building was vacated to make way for the new National Museum of Natural History.

The circle was officially renamed Teodoro F. Valencia Circle on January 5, 1990, through Republic Act No. 6836, after the former head of the National Parks Development Committee, who initiated and maintained Rizal Park's beautification.

== History ==
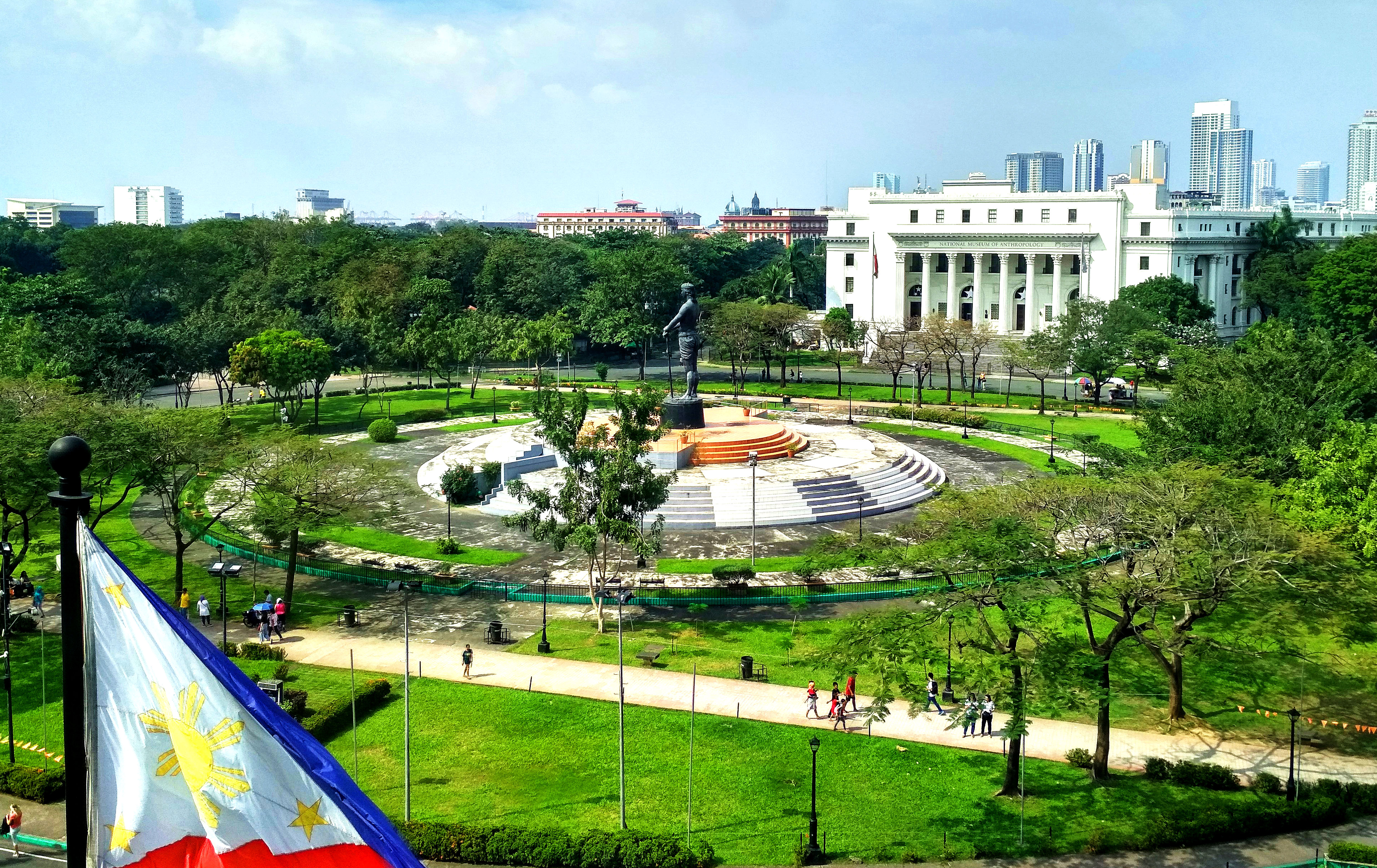
The circle prior to reconstruction and renovation, which moved the Sentinel of Freedom statue.

The Agrifina Circle was intended to be a grand civic plaza surrounded by the planned Capitol Building and five wedge-shaped buildings, which included the Finance and Agriculture Buildings, according to the Burnham Plan of Manila by American architect Daniel Burnham.

After World War II, when it was decided that the capital of the Philippines was to be moved to Quezon City, the then-plaza was converted into a roundabout. Vehicular traffic was allowed on the road until the late 1960s when Rizal Park was consolidated, and most roads going through the park were pedestrianized. A globe fountain and skating rink were installed on the central island.

There were plans to construct Luneta Tower, a 390-meter (1,280 ft) observation tower, at the Agrifina Circle for the Centennial Celebration of Philippine Independence in 1998. However, the decision to build the tower at the site was controversial, and the plan was eventually shelved.

By 2000, the Binhi ng Kalayaan Monument had replaced the fountain, but the skating rink remained. The monument was later moved to a barren area of Rizal Park in 2004 and was replaced by the Statue of the Sentinel of Freedom, a monument dedicated to Lapulapu.

== Layout ==
Location of buildings and features along the Agrifina Circle
Eastern side
Taft Avenue
Binhi ng Kalayaan Garden	*	Relief map of the Philippines (demolished)	*	Children's Park
Road		Agrifina Circle		General Luna Street
National Museum of Anthropology		Sentinel of Freedom (moved)		National Museum of Natural History
Road		Agrifina Circle		Road
Orchidarium	*	Bisig Marker	*	National Parks; Development Committee; Compound
Maria Y. Orosa Street
Rest of Rizal Park
Western side
Note: (*) Footpath
