= Trial and execution of José Rizal =

1896 trial in the Philippines

- Court: Court-martial
- Decided: December 26, 1896
- Verdict: Guilty; death penalty imposed on Jose Rizal (executed by firing squad on December 30)
- Charge: Formation of a secret society, being responsible for the existing rebellion, and treason

Filipino nationalist and author José Rizal was arrested and put on trial in late 1896 by Spanish authorities in Manila in the wake of the Philippine Revolution that started in August that year. Rizal had been exiled at Dapitan in Mindanao since 1892, following the publication of his second novel El filibusterismo (1891), but decided to go to Spain to serve as a doctor for the army in Cuba following the Cuban War of Independence. Following the outbreak of hostilities in Manila in late August, Rizal was notified that he was being implicated with the rebellion while en route to Spain. Upon arriving at Barcelona on October 5, he was temporarily detained before authorities sent him back to Manila to face charges of rebellion and treason. He arrived in Manila on November 3, where he was immediately imprisoned at Fort Santiago awaiting trial.

Proceedings started on December 3. Rizal, represented by a Spanish soldier named Luis Taviel de Andrade, was charged with three offenses at a court-martial. The trial opened on December 26 and was decided the same day, finding Rizal guilty and sentencing him to death by firing squad. Plans to rescue him by the revolutionaries were ultimately called off, following disapproval of Rizal himself. On the early morning hours of December 30, Rizal was executed at Bagumbayan, an open field that now bears his name.

Following the execution, Rizal's body was buried at an unmarked grave at Paco Park, but was quickly found and marked by his relatives. In the weeks that follow, Spanish authorities executed other Filipino nationalists in an attempt to curb the rebellion, which ultimately failed. Filipino revolutionaries quickly gained control of the country and declared independence from Spain less than two years after the execution. Spain sold the territory to the United States at the conclusion of the Spanish-American War in 1898.

Soon after, another war broke out between Filipino forces and the Americans, that lasted until 1902, following the capture of Emilio Aguinaldo. After the war, plans were made to create a monument for him at Bagumbayan as early as 1901. In 1898, Rizal's remains were temporarily interned at their home in Binondo after being exhumed at Paco Park. On December 30, 1912 he was buried at Luneta, now Rizal Park. In 1913, the Rizal Monument was inaugurated at the site.

== Background ==
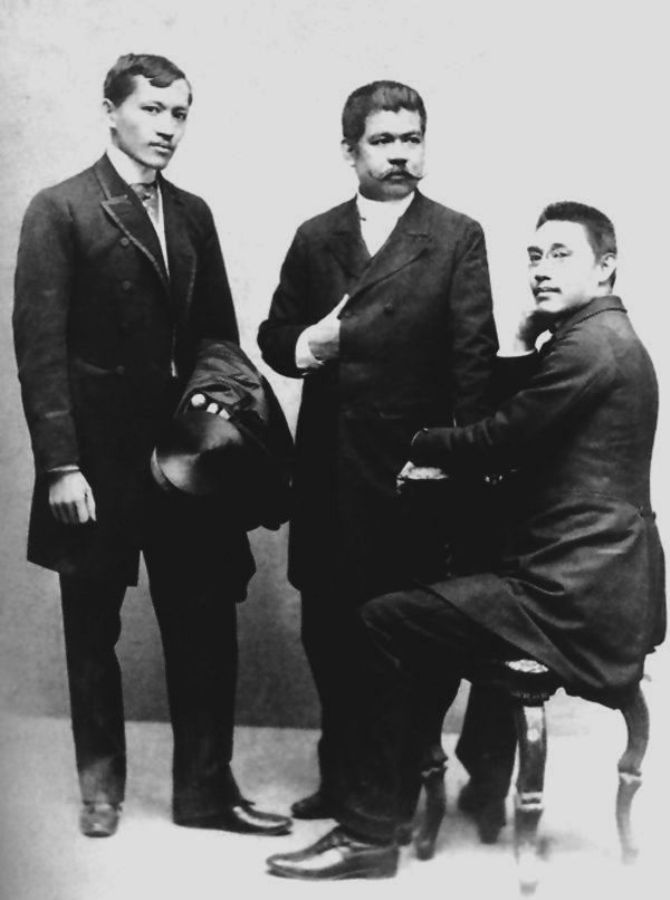
(From left to right) Rizal, Marcelo del Pilar, and Mariano Ponce, c. 1890

In February 1887, Rizal's first novel Noli Me Tángere was published in Berlin, Germany. The novel expressed the shortcomings of the Spanish judicial system and education as well as misfortunes during the era of Spanish colonialization. In August 1887, Rizal returned to the Philippines despite warnings from his brother Paciano and other relatives. Rizal wanted to see the effects of his works on Spaniards and Filipinos.

Upon arrival, he was ordered to the Malacañang Palace and faced repercussions after the Dominicans examined the novel's text. After remaining in Calamba for six months, he traveled to Hong Kong in February 1888. After, he went to Japan, the United States, and numerous places in Europe. In October 1887, he started writing his second novel, El filibusterismo. It was published in September 1891 in Belgium.

In 1892, he wanted to see the Philippines once more. He arrived in Manila, then held numerous meetings with the Governor-General to let his family return to the Philippines, as they were exiled in Hong Kong. Rizal was under constant surveillance. In his final interview, the Governor-General picked up pieces of the "Poor Friars" handbill that discussed the inconsistency between the Dominican order's wealthiness and the friars' poor situation. The handbill was found where Rizal stayed, causing him to be declared guilty and taken to Fort Santiago. After, Rizal was taken to a steamer and was exiled to Dapitan. In Dapitan, Rizal owned land. Over time, he built a house and headed a school and a hospital. Through Rizal, Dapitan was constantly improving.

Without Rizal's knowledge, his name has been used to gather Katipunan members. A portrait of him was hung in each Katipunan lodge hall. After Katipunan had wanted to start a revolution, Andrés Bonifacio requested Pío Valenzuela to seek advice from Rizal, bringing a blind man to conceal his mission. Rizal opposed the idea of a revolution upon hearing one. He cited Spanish territories that had started revolutions to signify that the Katipunan were not prepared for one. After Bonifacio received Rizal's response, he called Rizal a "coward" according to biographer Austin Craig and told Valenzuela to say nothing of the trip. Information leaked out and members quickly left the Katipunan.

== Final arrest and return to Manila ==
Rizal, some of his students, his partner Josephine Bracken, and his niece planned to go to Manila and then to Barcelona in July 1896, ending four years of exile in Dapitan. He had decided to go to Spain after he was accepted to serve in the Spanish army in Cuba and had received letters of recommendation from Governor-General Ramón Blanco. They arrived in Manila and boarded their boat to Barcelona named Castilla but on August 15, the Philippine Revolution commenced. Over the course of August, many battles emerged in Luzon. On September 2, Rizal was transferred to the mailboat Isla de Panay. Just after leaving the port, Rizal was told he was implicated in the ongoing rebellion and was confined to the cabin as a prisoner stemming from an order cabled from Manila. As they continued sailing to Spain, arrests and executions were prominent back in Luzon. On October 5, upon arrival at Barcelona, he was placed in the Montjuïc Castle and then re-embarked to Manila on a Spanish ship sending prisoners to the Philippines. According to Spanish law, Rizal was illegally entrapped in the ship yet, according to Craig, Spanish officials did not regularly follow laws. He was prohibited from disembarking during fuel stops. To prevent him from escaping he was thrown behind bars and handcuffed twice.

Sixteen hours before stopping at Singapore—the last docking before arriving at Manila—Rizal was jailed. Antonio María Regidor from London sent two telegrams to people in Singapore to request the Singaporean court for a writ of habeas corpus that would let Rizal walk free in Singapore. In 1882, an issuance of a writ allowed British prisoners held in a ship to disembark safely. The chief justice of Singapore rejected the application due to Rizal being a Spanish subject aboard a Spanish ship, allowing the Spanish government to protest the writ if one was issued and produce documents portraying Rizal as a dangerous criminal. Upon arrival at Manila on November 3, he was placed in Fort Santiago.

== Trial ==
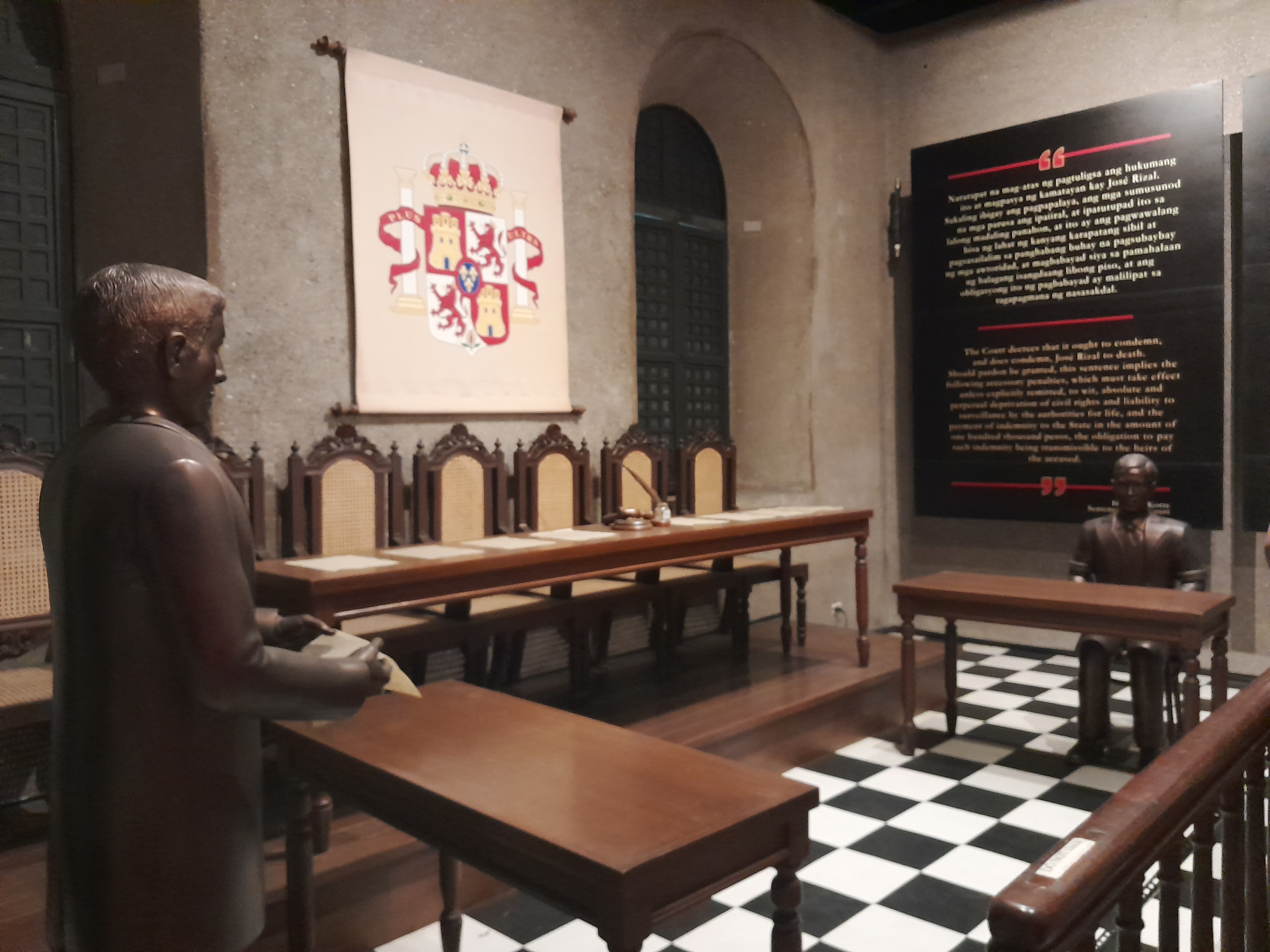
Statues depicting Rizal's trial

Rizal was initially held in a dungeon and later occupied a cell on the ground floor. He had to supply his own furniture; food was sent to him by his family and was carried by one of his former Dapitan pupils. His brother Paciano had been tortured in an attempt to gain evidence. He had been seated in a table at police headquarters; before him was a confession proving Rizal guilty that he was forced to sign. Due to him not signing the paper, he was hung up by the elbows and subsequently cut down. After three days of this treatment, he was too weak to sign, causing him to be carted home. Due to Rizal not approving the rebellion, he issued a manifesto to his countrymen who believed he was their leader.

Rizal was meant to be kept in the dungeon until death, but a preliminary investigation was requested upon him. After four days, the investigating officer sent the transcript of the investigation with supporting evidence to Governor-General Blanco. On December 2, the case was endorsed by an investigative judge, Rafael Dominguez. Blanco ordered Dominguez to begin the case "with all possible speed".

de Andrade did his best to defend Rizal and according to Austin Craig had risked unpopularity to be loyal to his client. Craig opined that it was risky to even say much resulting in the weakness of his defense. On December 3, the judge formulated three charges. He was found guilty of allegedly creating an illegal society (La Liga Filipina); he was responsible for the existing rebellion due to allegedly having caused it; and treason.

A report was made by Dominguez on December 5 with certain documents unavailable but, due to the need for speed the document was submitted nevertheless. The case was then endorsed to Auditor General de Guerra Nicolas de la Peña that same day. Two days later, Peña submitted his dictamen. A court-martial was then convened for his trial. No trained counsel was allowed to defend Rizal, yet he had been able to choose from a list of young army officers. He had picked Luis Taviel de Andrade, who had been the brother of Rizal's companion during his visit to the Philippines from 1887 to 1888.

On December 12, Rizal wrote the poem Mi último adiós and stuck it inside an alcohol cooking lamp. He wrote an address to insurgent Filipinos requesting them to "lay down their arms" due to the current insurrection being hopeless. The address was not made public yet was added to the charges against him. During the sentencing, Rizal's arms were tied as crowds condemned his actions.

On December 26, the trial opened. In a packed room, a 95-minute presentation of the case started. The crowd was bored and waited for Rizal's turn to speak. During his turn, Rizal stated his disapproval of the revolutionary movement and told Katipunan members what happened in Cuba. When asked if he knew Bonifacio before, Rizal said he did not. In the trial's end, he was asked if he wanted to say something. He then stood up and recited from handwritten notes that he was innocent and had not planned or encouraged the revolution. Rizal was sentenced to death by the court martial and, in the possibility of pardon granted by the crown, remaining under constant surveillance for the rest of his life and having to pay 20,000 pesos as damages.

== Last 24 hours ==
After the verdict, Rizal was told to acknowledge the regularity of the proceedings, to which he initially opposed; after a vain protest, he placed his signature. Rizal's trial held great interest and details of him were cabled to Madrid newspapers. A reporter who visited Rizal's cell said that the prisoner played the host and welcomed him. The reported further added that he was "perfectly calm and neutral" and not overwhelmed before his execution. Rizal, according to Craig, seemed to regret creating his novels. For his last 24 hours, Rizal was transported to the fort chapel. His family waited outside the Governor-General's office for a pardon, yet the General refused to see them. The mother and sisters had to say goodbye to Rizal in a chapel; Rizal had not been tied, yet he could not approach them. Rizal gave his sister, Trinidad, an alcohol cooking lamp that he used. He reported something inside in English for the guards not to understand.

Rizal greeted his former teachers and acquaintances in a friendly way. He requested for copies of the Gospels, the writings of Thomas à Kempis, and to be able to confess—requirements to legally marry Bracken. They were convinced Rizal was unorthodox after catechizing and a religious debate ensued. Eventually, he signed a retraction of his published beliefs. The archbishop had prepared a form showing essentials for reconciliation with the church; Rizal only objected a disavowal of Freemasonry, stating that in England, the practice was not hostile to the church. After kneeling at the altar, kissing an image of the Sacred Heart, heard mass, took communion, read his à Kempis, and prayed in the intervals, he married Bracken.

The retraction sparked controversy questioning its authenticity. In 1901, Roman Roque forged a document helping the Americans capture Emilio Aguinaldo in 1901. Before his death, Roque admitted that Rizal's retraction was allegedly forged by him. Some historians, particularly Austin Craig, Teodoro Kalaw, and Ambeth Ocampo, say the retraction was real while Ricardo Manapat, director of the National Archives of the Philippines, and a panelist said that the document was forged.

On December 29, as the groups Magdiwang and Magdalo were having their first meeting for unification in Imus, Paciano, Rizal's brother, arrived with Josephine Bracken. Paciano reported Rizal's eventual execution. According to Craig, General Emilio Aguinaldo and Supremo Andrés Bonifacio already knew by that time and had made a plan to rescue him. However, Paciano said that José disapproved of such rescues due to opining that the plan was doomed to fail due to the low Katipunan members in Manila. He further added that, if they were to save José, only one life should be risked since "two lives in the service of the nation could never be equal to one." According to Aguinaldo, Paciano refused the plan repeatedly, saying "do not dare save my brother if you want to avoid bloodshed" numerous times. Many arrests of Katipunan members had already happened and José did not want more people to die. While in prison, Rizal had received several religious books and pictures that he used as remembrances for members of his family.

== Execution ==
Rizal had traveled by foot from the fort to Bagumbayan Field—currently Rizal Park—where he would be executed. His arms were tied behind his back as he was being watched by a guard. The Jesuits accompanied him while some of his schoolboys viewed from the crowd. Rizal seemed pale due to lack of breakfast, only eating three hard-boiled eggs. The procession began at 6:30 a.m. He wore a black coat, pants, and cravat, and a white shirt and waistcoat. He was tied elbow to elbow and wore a bowler hat. A bugler started the procession with drums draped in black cloth signifying his last moments. Behind him was de Andrade, while beside him were two Jesuits. From Fort Santiago, he went right. He walked along the Malecon Drive—a route he used to take during his college in Ateneo—and saw the twin towers of the university along with a view of the rising sun on Manila Bay. As he passed by Ateneo, he exclaimed "Is that Ateneo? I spent many happy years there". During the procession, he also said "What a beautiful morning! On mornings like this, I used to take walks here with my sweetheart". Many onlookers lined the streets, awaiting Rizal's execution.

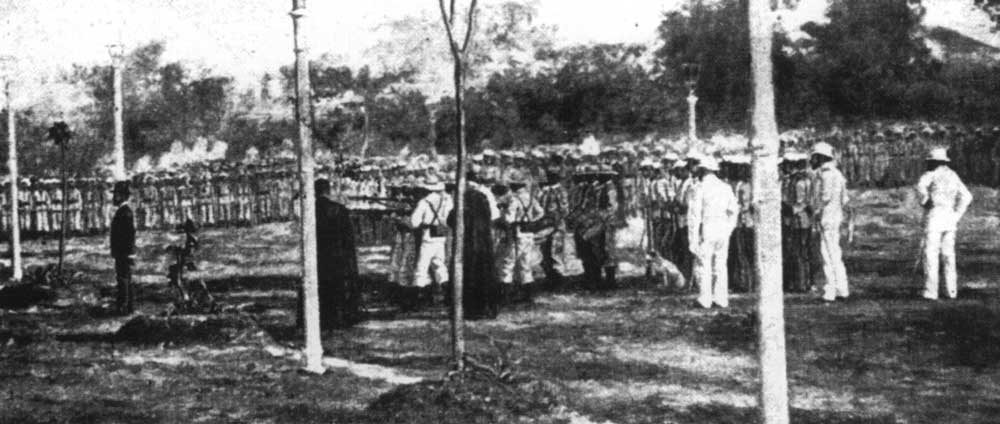
A photograph of Rizal's execution, taken by Manuel Arias Rodríguez

During the procession, Rizal was seen nodding his head to people he recognized and cracking jokes with the Jesuits beside him. Bystanders noticed Rizal's eyes darting left to right, assuming an escape attempt was going to happen. Troops pushed the crowds back, leaving an empty square for Rizal's execution. Artillery behind the soldiers prevented chances of a rescue. The firing squad comprised Filipino soldiers; Spaniards stood beyond them, with better weapons. Due to Rizal's calmness, a nearby Spanish soldier grew curious and asked him if he can feel his pulse. Rizal did not reply, yet the soldier moved his hands away from his body the farthest cords that trapped Rizal allowed. The soldier placed his hands on Rizal's wrist and felt a steady heartbeat with neither excitement nor fear.

Rizal had requested to face the officers, but the commanding officer denied it. Rizal elaborated that he did not deserve such a death, for he was no traitor to Spain. His head was promised to be respected, though. Unblindfolded Rizal turned to his back to receive the bullets, twisting his hand under the shoulder to indicate where the soldiers would shoot to reach his heart faster. The captain raised his saber in the air and shouted "Preparen!" for the soldiers to prepare. He then said "Apunten!" and brought down his saber, saying "Fuego!" A split second before the soldiers shot Rizal, he said the two last words of Christ, "Consummatum Est" (transl. It is done). As shots fired, Rizal performed a previously choreographed twist that made him fall face up. As the audience held their breath, a soldier walked up to Rizal and shot the "shots of grace" that would kill him. The military mascot ran around the corpse whining while Spaniards in the crowd shouted "Long live Spain! Death to the traitor!" The Spanish national anthem played as laughter and applause was heard, for the execution was the social event of the day.

== Aftermath ==
About an hour after the shooting, a wagon took Rizal's body to Paco Cemetery. The civil governor of Manila and members of a Church society were present. Rizal had been wearing a black suit and a derby hat. The remains of Rizal were enclosed in a plain box. While he was being buried, no guests were allowed to watch, as Filipinos might steal his body and collect his clothes as a souvenir. The government planned the burial spot to be kept secret, but friends of Rizal's family who had attended the funeral placed a marble slab with Rizal's name engraved. Rizal's burial entry had three or four words of explanation that are now erased. Rizal's family members were scattered across friends' houses to avoid resentment brought against them from the killing of Rizal. In midnight, Rizal's family had decided to open the alcohol cooking lamp. They saw a hairpin and a folded piece of paper hidden where nobody could see it. The paper was copied and mailed to Rizal's close friends. Two weeks after Rizal's execution, 12 other members of La Liga Filipina, an organization Rizal started, were executed in Luneta. Revolutionary leaders lived in exile in Hong Kong. Eventually, the leaders went back to the Philippines to continue fighting against the Spanish. On the first anniversary of Rizal's death, Spaniards polluted the grave while Rizal's family hung wreaths. The Spaniards surrendered from Manila on August 13, with the Spanish flag coming down from Fort Santiago.
