= Jose M. Mendoza =

Filipino sculptor

- Education: University of Santo Tomas
- Notable work: Giant Relief Map of the Philippines; Bisig
- Movement: Classical / Modern

Jose M. Mendoza is a Filipino sculptor whose notable works include the Giant Relief Map of the Philippines and Bisig in Rizal Park.

== Early life and education ==
A son of a toymaker, Mendoza grew up in the 1950s with wooden toys and later referenced these to create his own works. After graduating from the University of Santo Tomas' College of Fine Arts, Mendoza worked as a color separator in a publishing house despite being color blind for three years.

Mendoza considered returning to college to become a sculptor but upon Idelfonso Marcelo's recommendation, decided to be under the mentorship of sculptor Napoleon Abueva, who would be later recognized as National Artist. Learning sculpting with Abueva, Mendoza experimented with various mediums such as marble, wood, bronze and fiber. Although he was hesitant with working with bronze, due to difficulties involving casting, it became his primary medium as a career sculptor.

== Works ==
Several monuments and sculptures in the Rizal Park in Manila was made by Mendoza. His first major works are the huge tamaraw and carabao statues in the park made sometime in 1967. Another work of Mendoza in the park Bisig which is a collaboration with Napoleon Adorra and Francisco Cruz and a winning entry of the 1968 National Art Association of the Philippines Competition. The giant Relief Map of the Philippines is another notable work installed in the park which took nine months to complete and costed millions of pesos, which was demolished by the National Museum of the Philippines in 2023 to make way for an exhibition hall. His other works for Rizal Park include Janus, Children’s Playground, Garden for the Blind and Reliefs in Cement.

His other works include:

- Tug-of-War (in front of the former InterContinental Manila, Makati)
- Gabriela Silang (Ayala Avenue, Makati)
- Pio del Pilar (Paseo de Roxas, Makati)
- Sultan Kudarat (Makati Avenue, Makati)
- Bataan Monument (Ayala Triangle, Makati)
- Centennial Monument of Peace and Unity (Davao)
- The Risen Christ (Magallanes Church, Maasin, Southern Leyte)
- Monuments of Jose Yao Campos and Mariano K. Tan

== Personal life ==
Mendoza has children, among them is Jordan who is also a sculptor.
