= National Museum Complex (Manila) =

Museum complex in Manila, Philippines

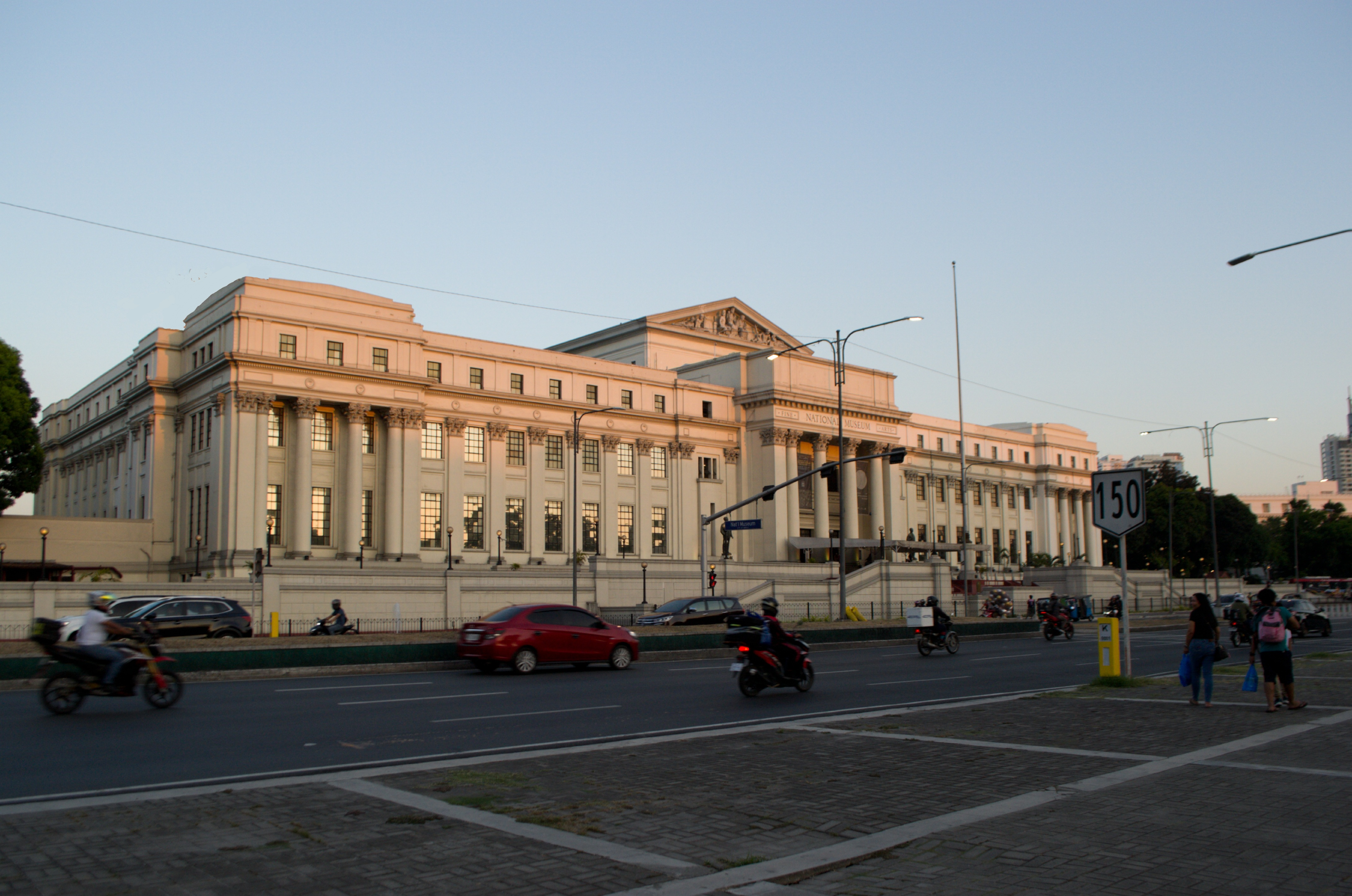
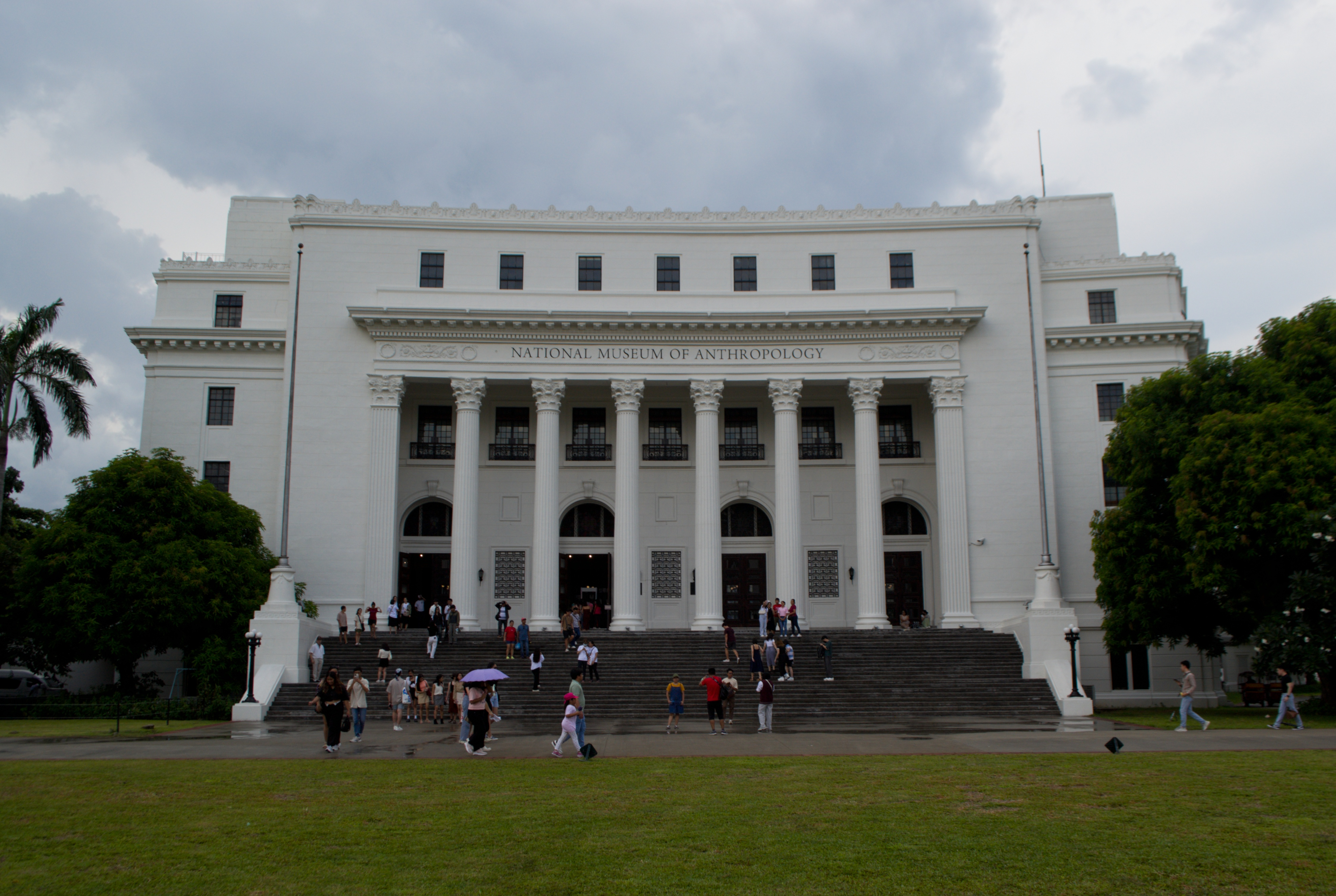
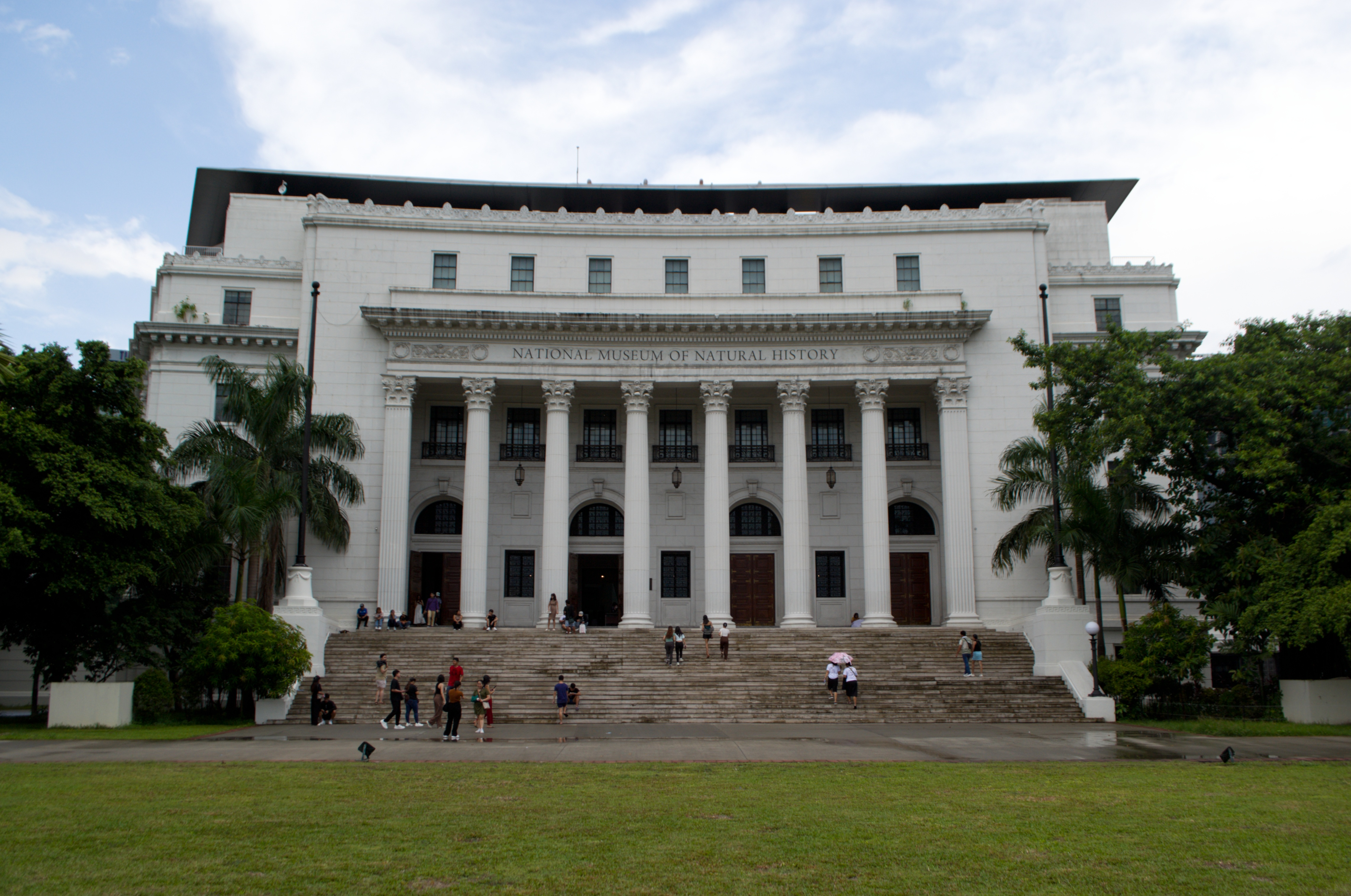
- The three museums of the complex in 2024: National Museum of Fine Arts (top), Anthropology (bottom left), Natural History (bottom right)
- Established: 1998
- Location: Manila, Philippines
- Coordinates: 14°35′06″N 120°58′52″E
- Type: National museum complex
- Owner: National Museum of the Philippines
- Public transit access: United Nations; 6 17 United Nations

National Museum of the Philippines
- National Museum of Fine Arts; National Museum of Anthropology; National Museum of Natural History; National Planetarium

The National Museum Complex in Manila refers to the main or central museums of the National Museum of the Philippines in Manila, most of which are within the grounds of the Rizal Park.

== Background ==
The National Museum Complex is the collective designation for the central museums of the National Museum of the Philippines as per the Republic Act No. 8492. also known as the National Museum Act of 1998. It reserved the Executive House Building (also known as the Old Congress Building), the Department of Finance Building and the Department of Tourism Building along the Agrifina Circle in Rizal Park, as the permanent and exclusive site of the National Museum. The National Planetarium, also within the site of the Rizal Park and managed by the National Museum since 1975, was included in the complex by virtue of Republic Act No. 11333. The buildings named in Republic Act No. 8492 would be converted into distinct museums.

The National Museum of the Philippines, the umbrella museum institution of the government, is responsible in managing and developing the Complex.

== Features ==
=== Institutions ===
Institution	Building	Opened
National Museum of Fine Arts	Executive House (Congress/Legislative Building)	2000
National Museum of Anthropology	Department of Finance Building	1998
National Museum of Natural History	Department of Tourism Building (Agriculture and Commerce Building)	2017
National Planetarium	—N/a	1975 (now closed)

=== Monuments ===
- Gomburza Monument: The Gomburza Monument by Solomon Saprid, opposite the Executive Building, shall be maintained by the National Museum.
- Sentinel of Freedom (Lapu-Lapu Monument): The Sentinel of Freedom, or the Lapu-Lapu Monument by Juan Sajid Imao in the present Agrifina Circle is likewise maintained by the National Museum.
