= Bawal Mag-Shoot Dito =

Philippine advocacy group

- Abbreviation: BMSD
- Formation: 2011; 15 years ago
- Type: Advocacy group
- Purpose: Freedom of expression on taking photography of public spaces
- Methods: Photowalks
- Field: Photography

Bawal Mag-Shoot Dito (BMSD) is an organization of Filipino photographers that advocates for freedom of expression in public spaces, opposing the undue restriction of photography, particularly the use of DSLR cameras by individuals in places such as national parks and other public sites in the Philippines

== History ==
Bawal Mag-Shoot Dito organized a "photo-walk" at Rizal Park in November 2011 to protest what they believe are restrictive photography restrictions imposed on Filipino photographers and tourist enforced by security guards and the alleged leniency towards their foreign counterparts. In response the National Parks Development Committee released a statement that there is "no shoot" policy imposed for personal photography at Rizal and Intramuros but those seeking to use the venues for commercial purposes such as television commercials and prenuptials are encouraged to apply for a permit. The group argues that, despite the lack of a 'no permit, no shoot' policy for personal or hobbyist photography, experiences on the ground suggest otherwise and has called for clearer guidelines.

They staged a demonstration again on June 12, 2013 to protest for the continued treatment of Filipino photographers in the park. BMSD accused of security guards of profiling DSLR users of bypassing the commercial photography policy. alleged that security guards have asked photographers to pay ₱500 to be allowed to shoot which they called an "extortion".

In November 2023, they staged the "Tigil-Pitik Photowalk" at the Arroceros Urban Forest Park to protest against the management's "no permit, no shooting" policy applied to photography produced by DSLR and SLR cameras.

== Postitions of photography regulations ==
Bawal Mag-Shoot Dito posits itself as an advocate of freedom of expression through photography believing that Filipinos should be free to take photos of historic and public sites such as the Rizal Monument. They insist that it is beneficial to the promotion of the Philippines' heritage and tourism.

They are critical of "no permit, no shoot" policies imposed by administrators of these places which is targeted towards users of DSLR and other bulky digital cameras which are allegedly not applied to foreign nationals.

They have called for a law to recognize historic and public sites as "photographer-friendly".
