= National Parks Development Committee =

- Komite sa Pagpapaunlad ng mga Pambansang Liwasan

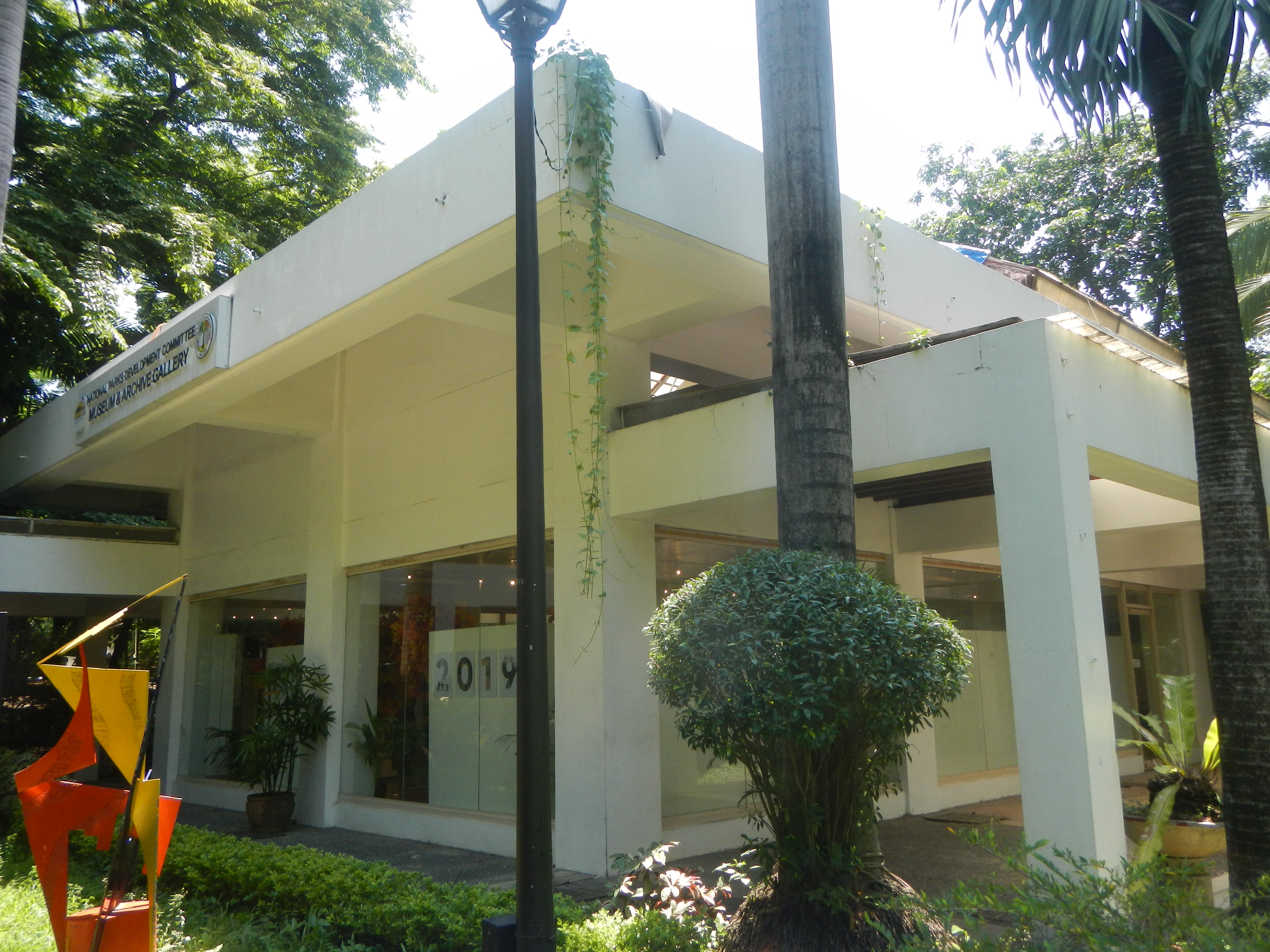
- The NPDC office in June 2019

Agency overview
- Formed: January 14, 1963; 63 years ago
- Jurisdiction: Philippines
- Headquarters: Old Planetarium Building, Padre Burgos Avenue, Rizal Park, Manila
- Employees: 135 (2024)
- Annual budget: ₱231.54 million (2021)
- Agency executives: Cecille Lorenzana Romero, Executive Director; Jezreel Gaius Antonio Apelar, Deputy Executive Director
- Parent department: Department of Tourism
- Website: npdc.gov.ph

The National Parks Development Committee (NPDC; Filipino: Komite sa Pagpapaunlad ng mga Pambansang Liwasan) is an agency of the Department of Tourism (DOT) of the Philippines that is mandated to develop, preserve, and manage Rizal Park (Luneta) and Paco Park in Manila and other parks that may be assigned to it. Its main office is located in the Old Planetarium Building, Padre Burgos Avenue, Rizal Park, Ermita, Manila. Both the Executive Director and the Deputy Executive Director are appointed by the President of the Philippines.

As an attached agency of the DOT, the NPDC shall support programs and projects implemented by the Department in their promotion of inclusive growth and wide distribution of economic benefits through the tourism industry along with its mandate to develop, administer, and manage the Rizal and Paco Parks in Manila, and other parks that may be assigned to it.

NPDC envisions to be the lead agency that will provide fully-developed and well- maintained parks for the Filipinos, wholesome recreation and socio-cultural education through partnership with the community and Non-Government Organizations (NGOs) which shall contribute towards the enrichment of national identity and heritage.

NPDC aims to provide the general public with access to and enjoyment of an open park, showcase national heritage that will promote Filipino arts, culture and tradition, develop new parks and conducive business climate consonant to preservation of historical significance, and establish inter-agency linkages to achieve the agency’s thrust and programs.

In 2022, the NPDC spearheaded the Philippine Parks Congress in partnership with the Department of Tourism and its attached agencies, City of Manila and City of Baguio, and other NGOs to promote the development of more parks across the Philippines.

== History ==
- Executive Order No. 30 (January 14, 1963) created the Executive Committee for the development of the Quezon Memorial, Luneta, and other National Parks.
- Executive Order No. 69 (February 7, 1964) designated the Committee created under E.O. No. 30 as the National Parks Development Committee (NPDC).
- Executive Order No. 120 (January 20, 1987) reorganized the Ministry of Tourism and defined its powers and functions.
- Executive Order No. 120-A (January 30, 1987) attached the NPDC to the Ministry, later Department, of Tourism.
- Executive Order No. 160 (October 13, 1999) amended the composition of the NPDC created under E. O. No. 30 s. 1963 with the DOT Secretary as Chairperson.

== Managed sites ==
=== Current ===
- Rizal Park, Manila
- Paco Park, Manila

=== Former ===
- Quezon Memorial Circle, Quezon City
- Burnham Park, Baguio
- Fort Santiago, Intramuros, Manila
- Pook ni Maria Makiling Forest Park, Los Baños, Laguna
- Mabini Shrine, Manila
- Plaza Olivia Salamanca, Manila

== Board of directors ==
The decision-making policy of NPDC is lodged with the Board of Directors.

- Chair: Secretary, Department of Tourism
- Vice Chair: Executive Director, National Parks Development Committee
- Director: Mayor, City of Manila
- Director: COO, Tourism Promotions Board
- Director: COO, Tourism Infrastructure and Enterprise Zone Authority
- Director: Administrator, Intramuros Administration
- Director: Secretary, Department of Public Works and Highways
