= National Museum of Anthropology (Manila) =

Anthropology museum in Manila, Philippines

- Pambansang Museo ng Antropolohiya (Filipino)
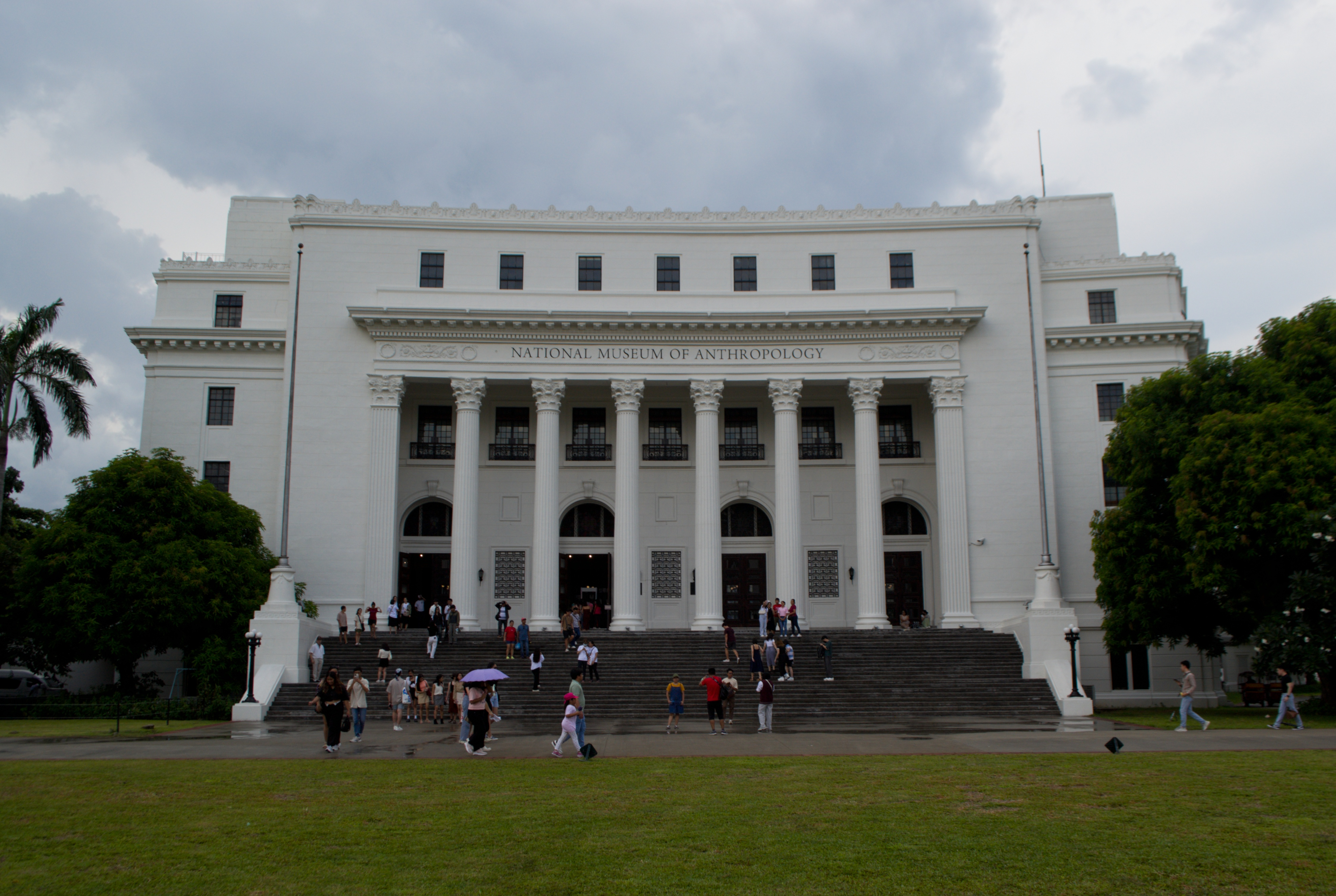
- The museum in 2024

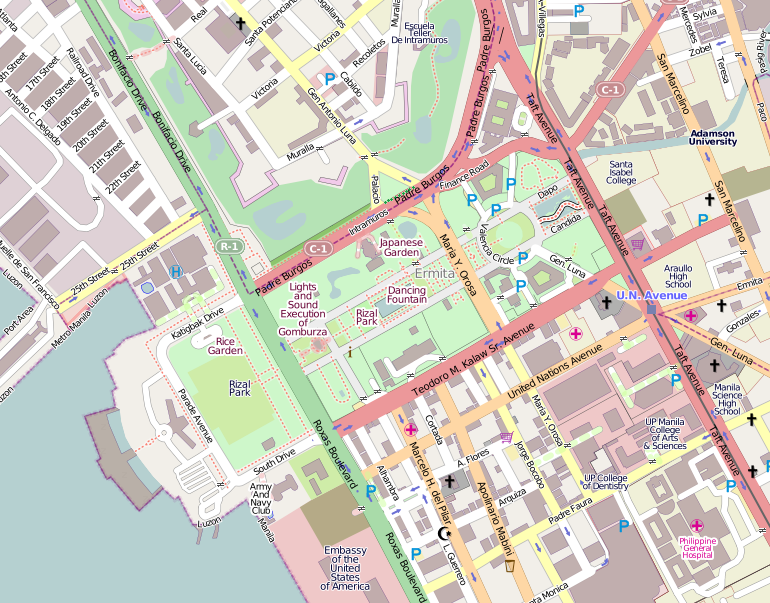
- Location within Rizal Park Location within Manila Location within Metro Manila Location within Luzon Location within Philippines
- Coordinates: 14°35′07″N 120°58′51″E
- Type: Anthropology museum
- Public transit access: United Nations

National Museum of the Philippines
- National Museum of Fine Arts; National Museum of Anthropology; National Museum of Natural History; National Planetarium
- Building details
- Former names: Department of Finance Building; Museum of the Filipino People

General information
- Status: Completed
- Architectural style: Neoclassical
- Location: Agrifina Circle, Rizal Park, Manila, Philippines
- Construction started: 1916
- Completed: 1918

Design and construction
- Architect: Ralph Harrington Doane

The National Museum of Anthropology (Filipino: Pambansang Museo ng Antropolohiya), formerly known as the Museum of the Filipino People (Filipino: Museo ng Lahing Filipino), is a component museum of the National Museum of the Philippines dedicated to ethnological and archaeological exhibitions. It is located in the Agrifina Circle, Rizal Park, Manila, adjacent to the National Museum of Fine Arts building.

The museum is housed in a neoclassical building constructed between 1916 and 1918 from a design by Canadian-American architect Ralph Harrington Doane, who served as consulting architect to the Philippine government. The building formerly housed the Department of Finance. Among its notable collections are artifacts recovered from the wreck of the San Diego, as well as archaeological, ethnological, and zoological specimens.

== Current galleries and offices ==
=== Ground floor ===
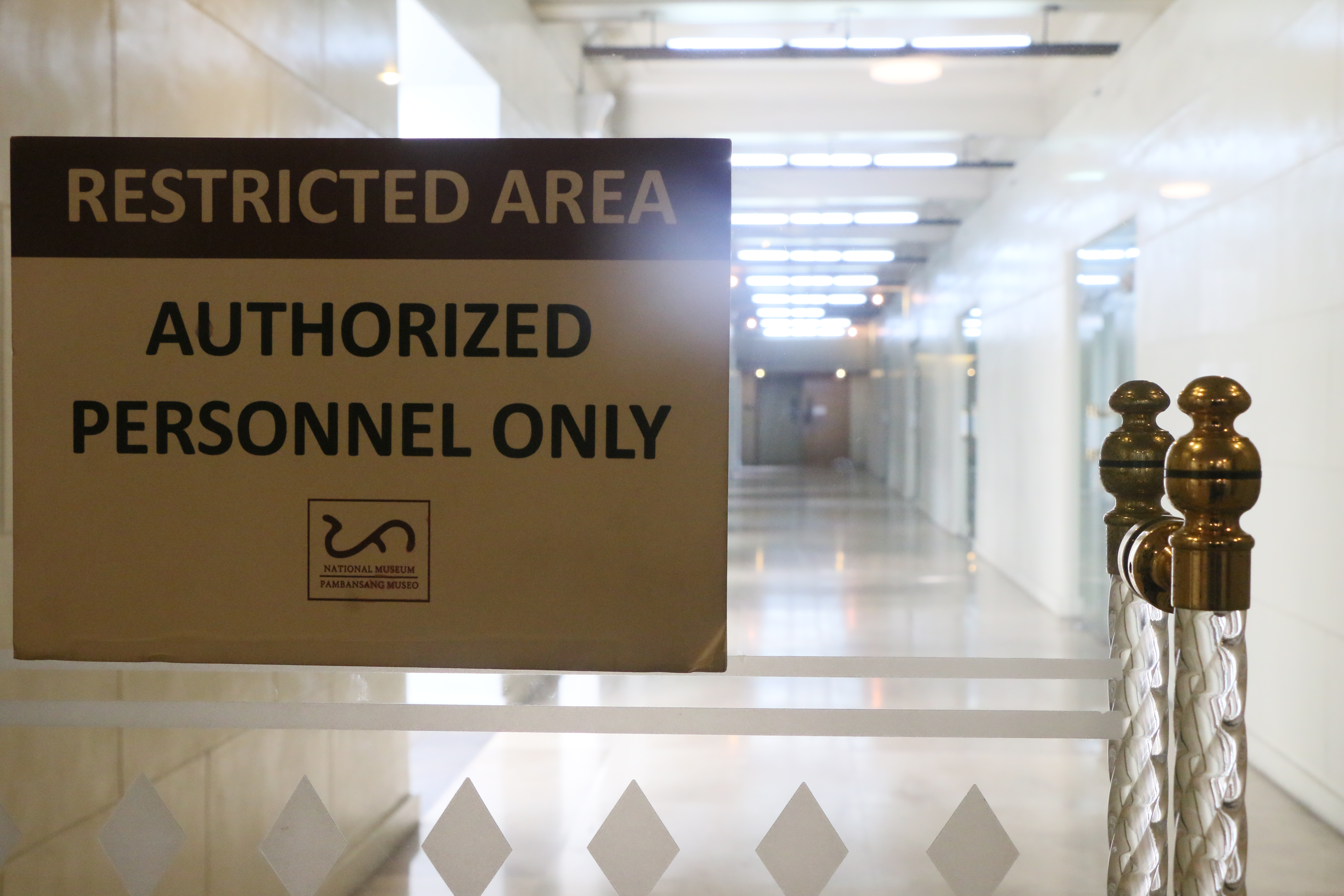
Hallway leading to the offices

- Ifugao House / Courtyard
- Office of the Exhibition, Editorial, and Media Production Services Division
- Office of the Museum Foundation of the Philippines
- Office of the Archaeology Division
- Office of the Ethnology Division
- Office of the Maritime and Underwater Cultural Heritage Division
- National Museum Library

=== Second floor ===
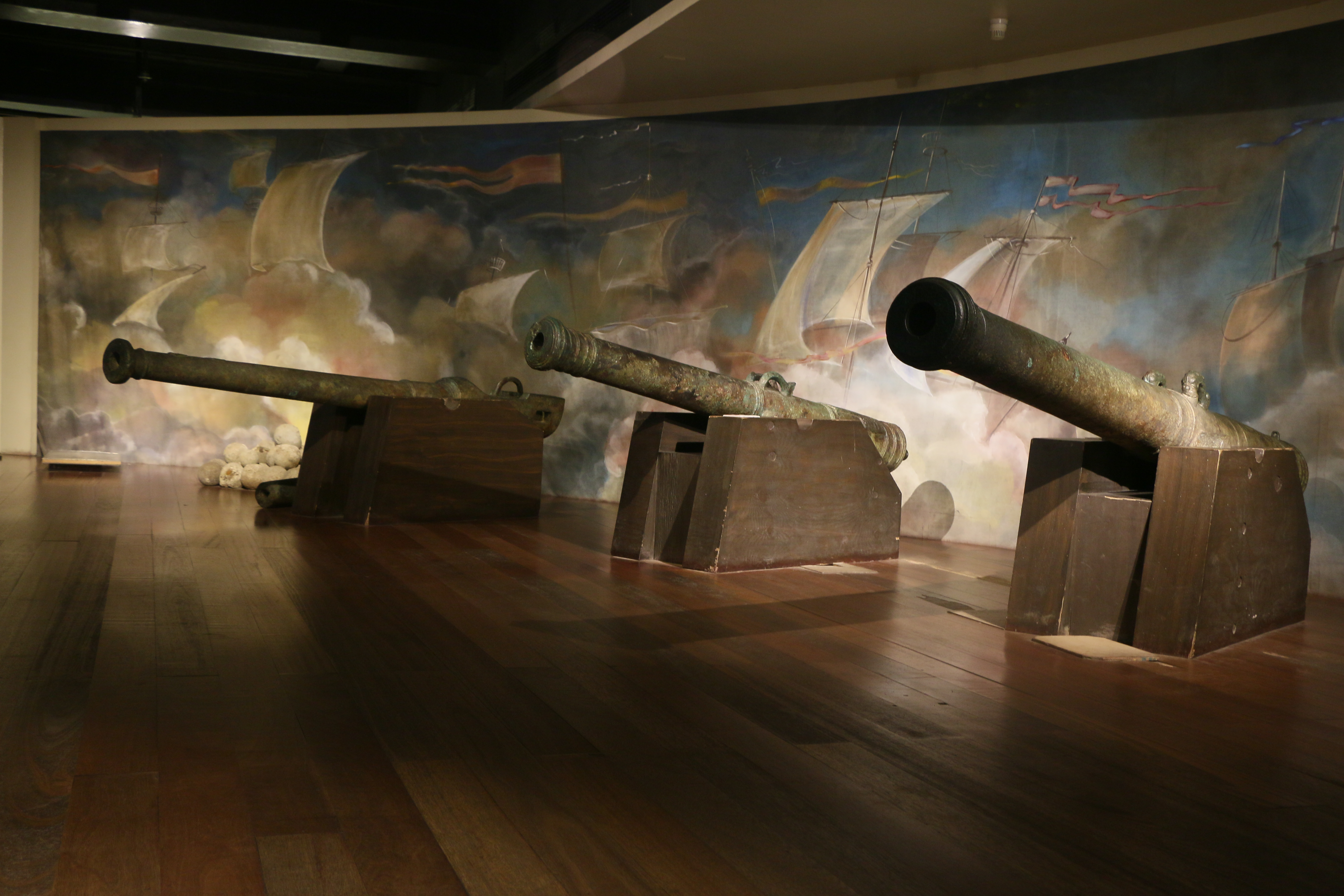
The San Diego: 500 Years of Maritime Trade Gallery

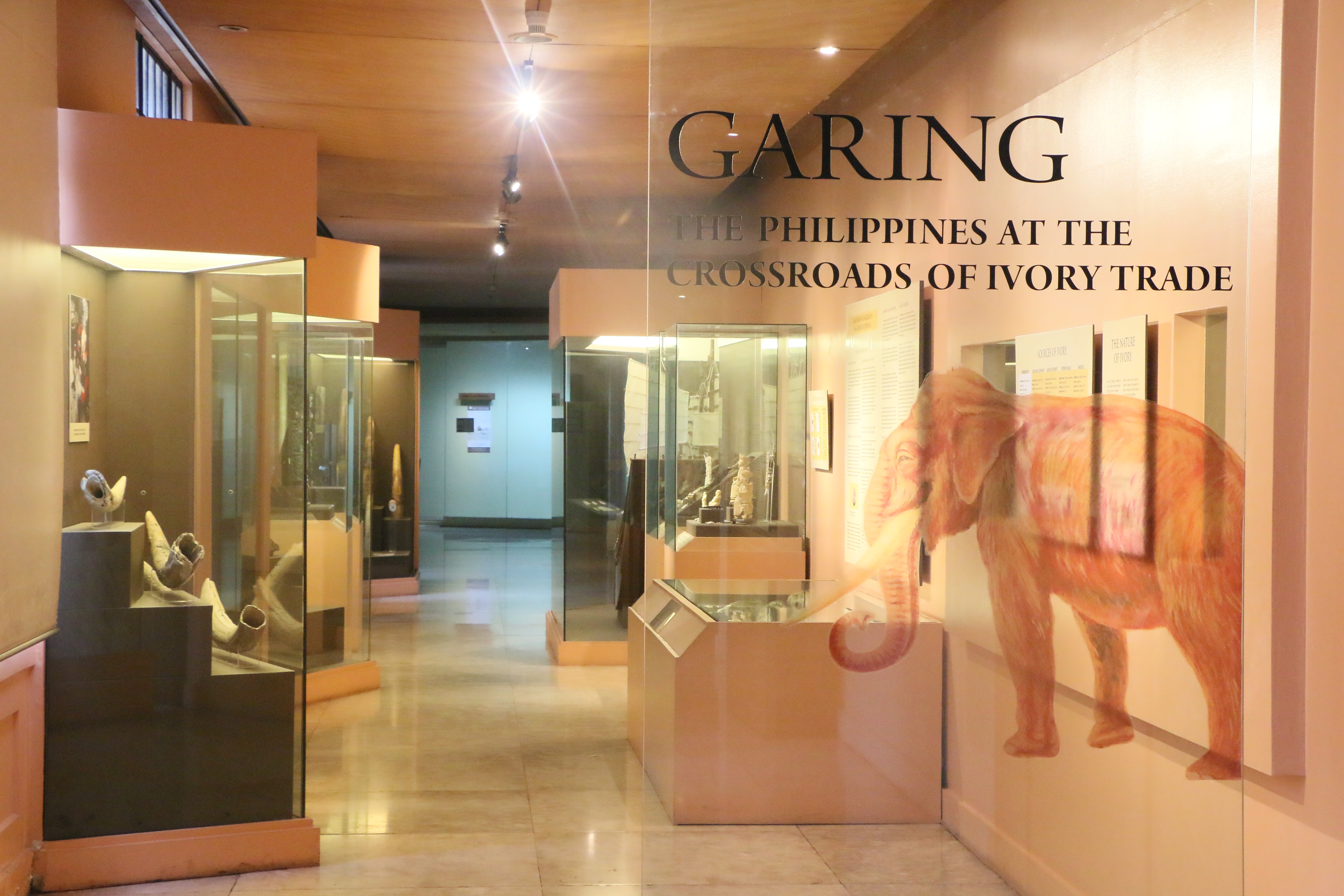
Garing: The Philippines at the Crossroads of Ivory Trade Gallery

- Marble Hall
- The San Diego: 500 Years of Maritime Trade
- Garing: The Philippines at the Crossroads of Ivory Trade

=== Third floor ===
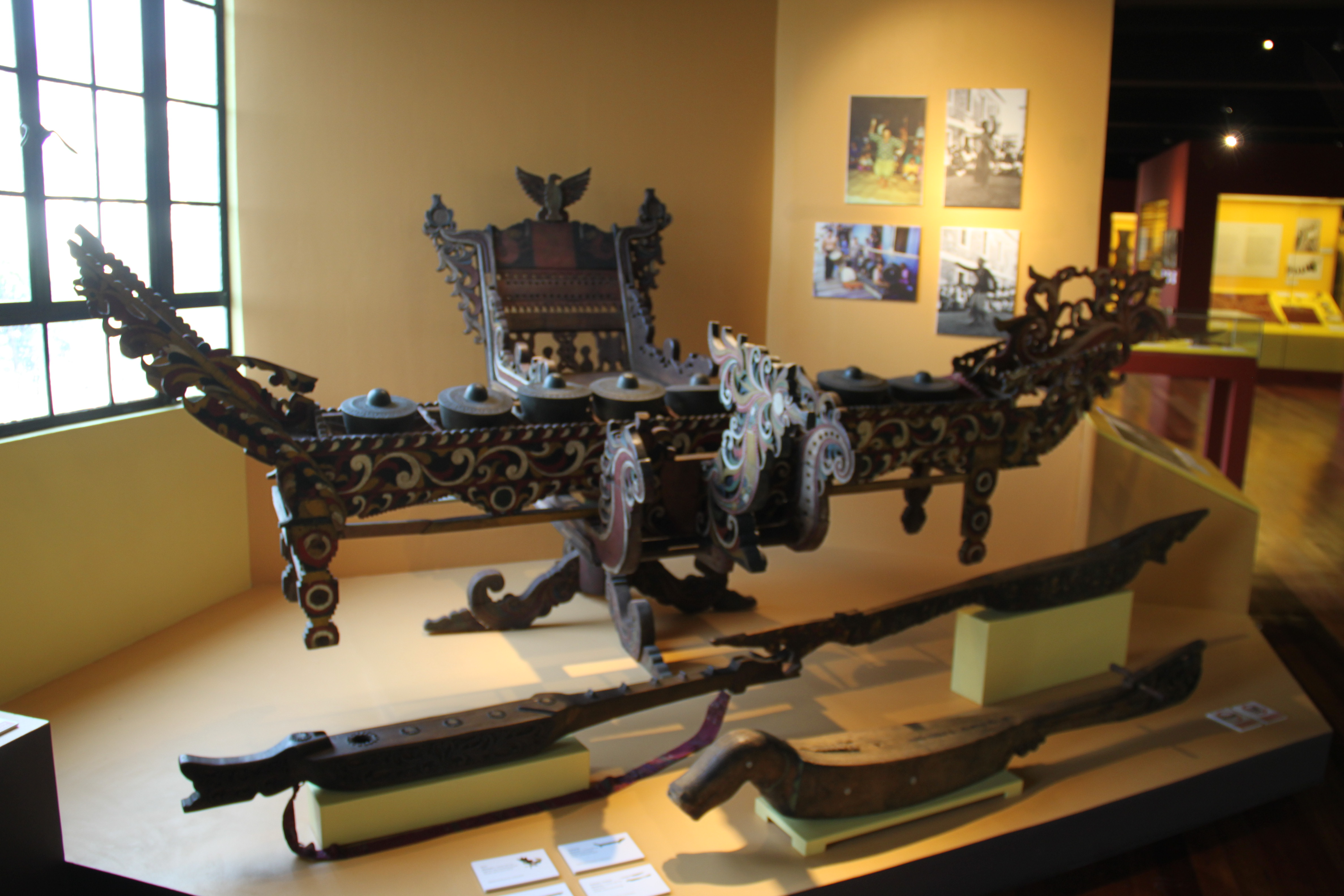
A Maranao kulintang ensemble displayed at the Bangsamoro Gallery

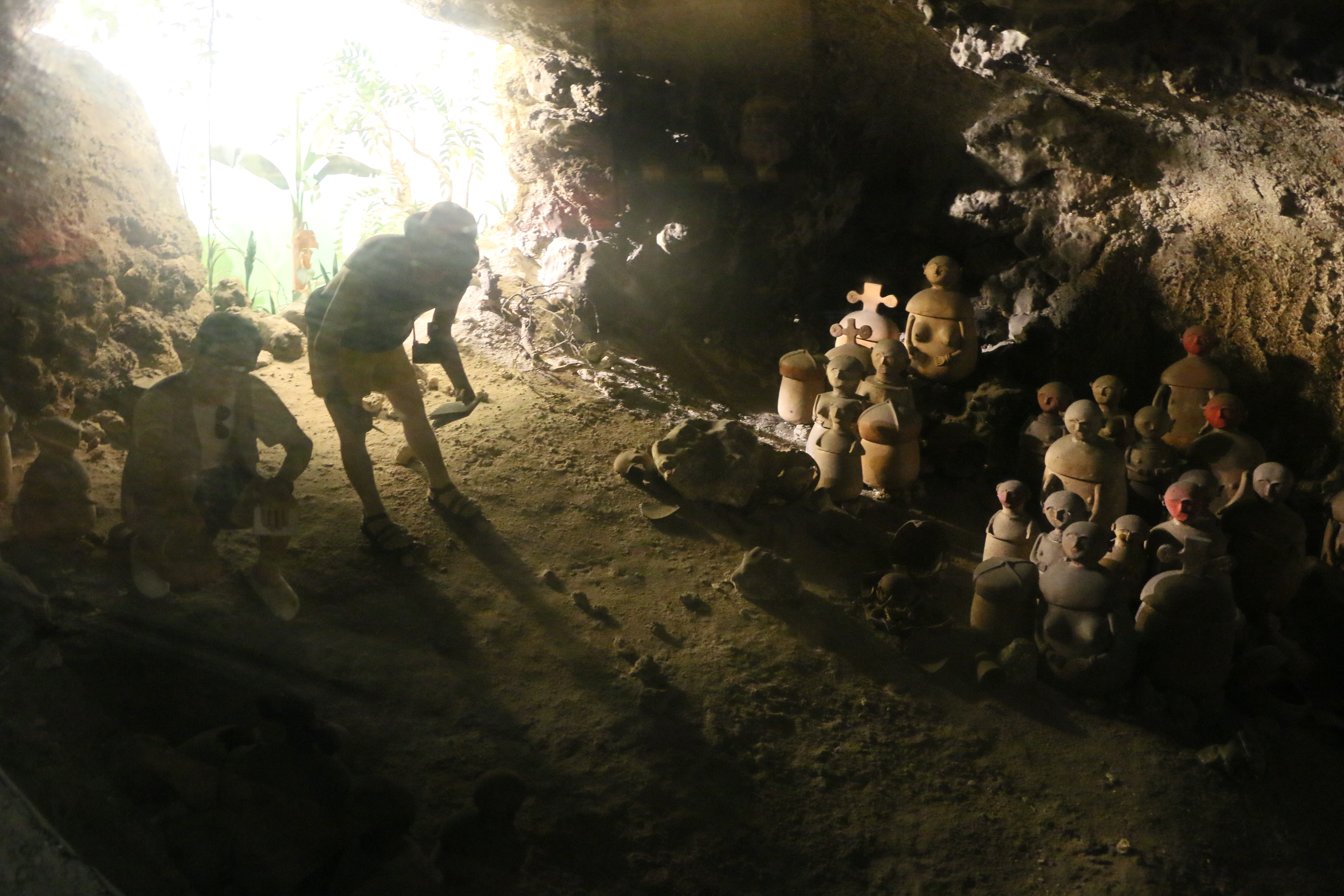
A diorama of the discovery of burial jars displayed at the "Kaban ng Lahi" Gallery

- Lantaka: Of War and Peace
- Manlilikha ng Bayan Hall (National Living Treasure)
- Lumad: Mindanao
- Faith, Tradition and Place: Bangsamoro Art from the National Ethnographic Collection
- Kaban ng Lahi (Archaeological Treasures)
- Biyay: Traditional Ecological Knowledge among Philippine Negrito Communities
- Anito: Beliefs, Traditions and the Afterlife in Northern Luzon

=== Fourth floor ===
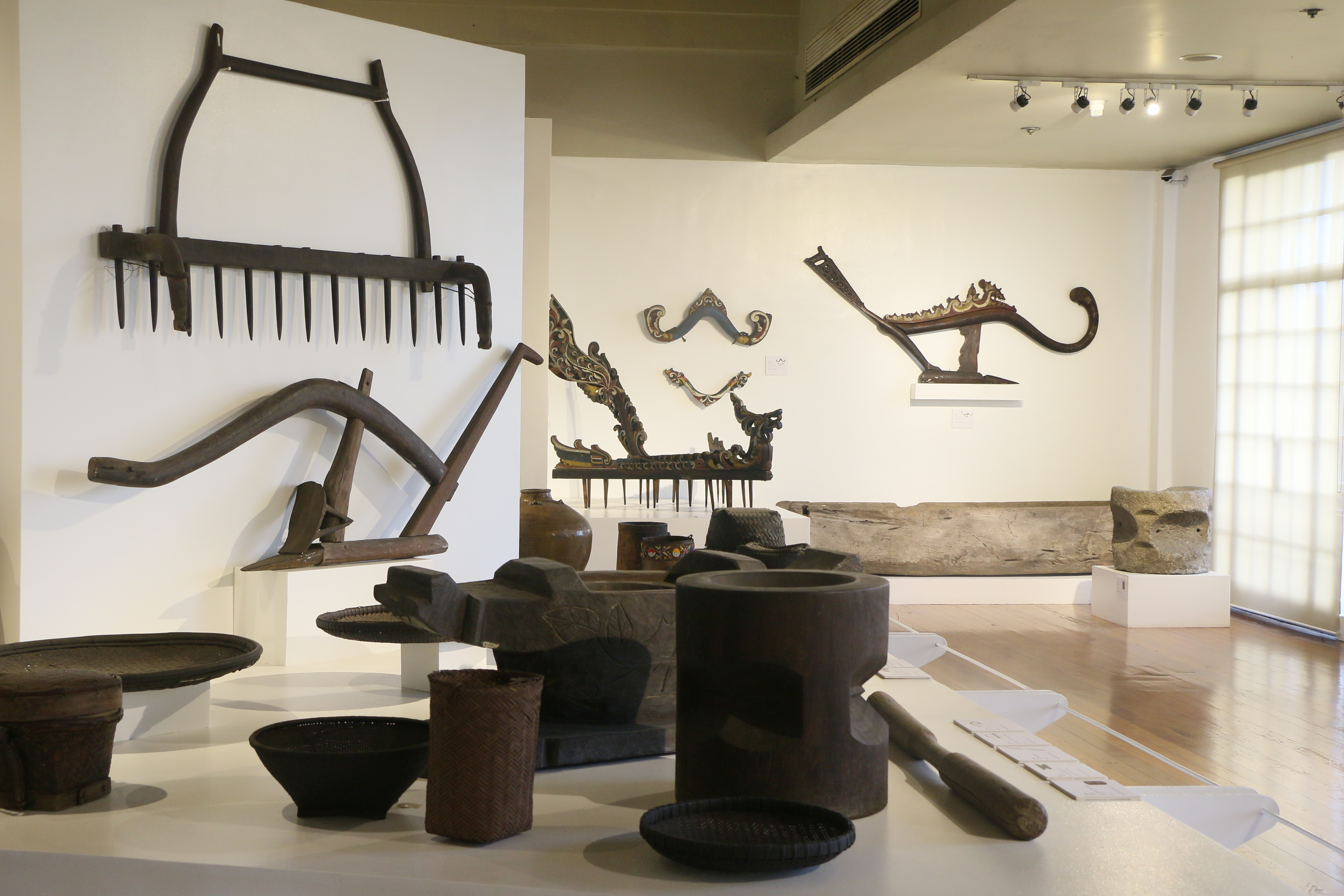
Rice, Biodiversity and Climate Change Gallery

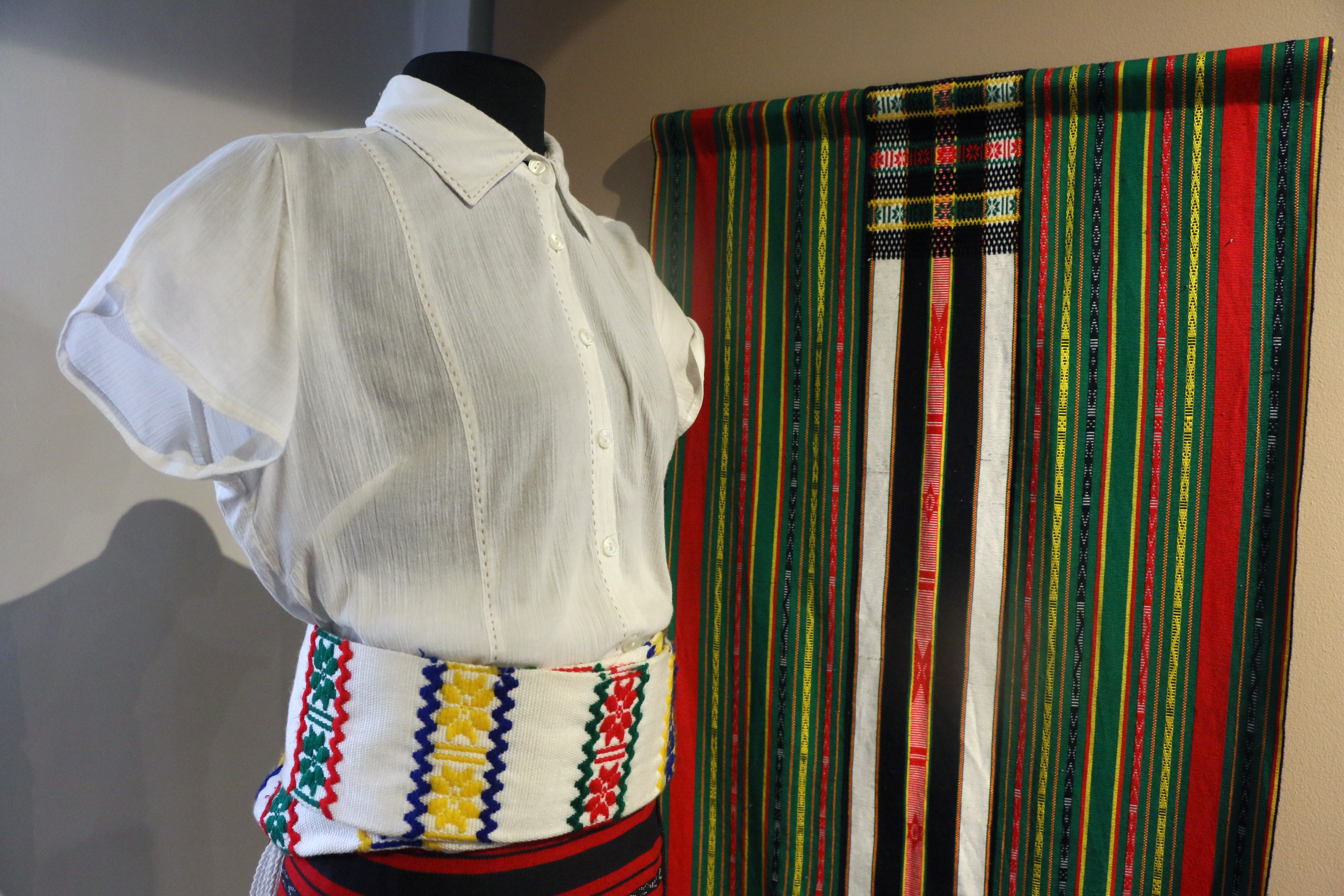
One of the textiles exhibited at the Hibla ng Lahing Filipino Gallery

- Reception Hall (Changing Gallery)
- Rice, Biodiversity and Climate Change
- Hibla ng Lahing Filipino: The Artistry of Philippine Textiles
- Baybayin: Ancient and Traditional Scripts of the Philippines
- Entwined Spheres: Mats and Baskets as Containers, Costumes and Conveyors
- Office of the Museum Services Division

=== Fifth floor ===
- National Ethnographic Collection Repositories
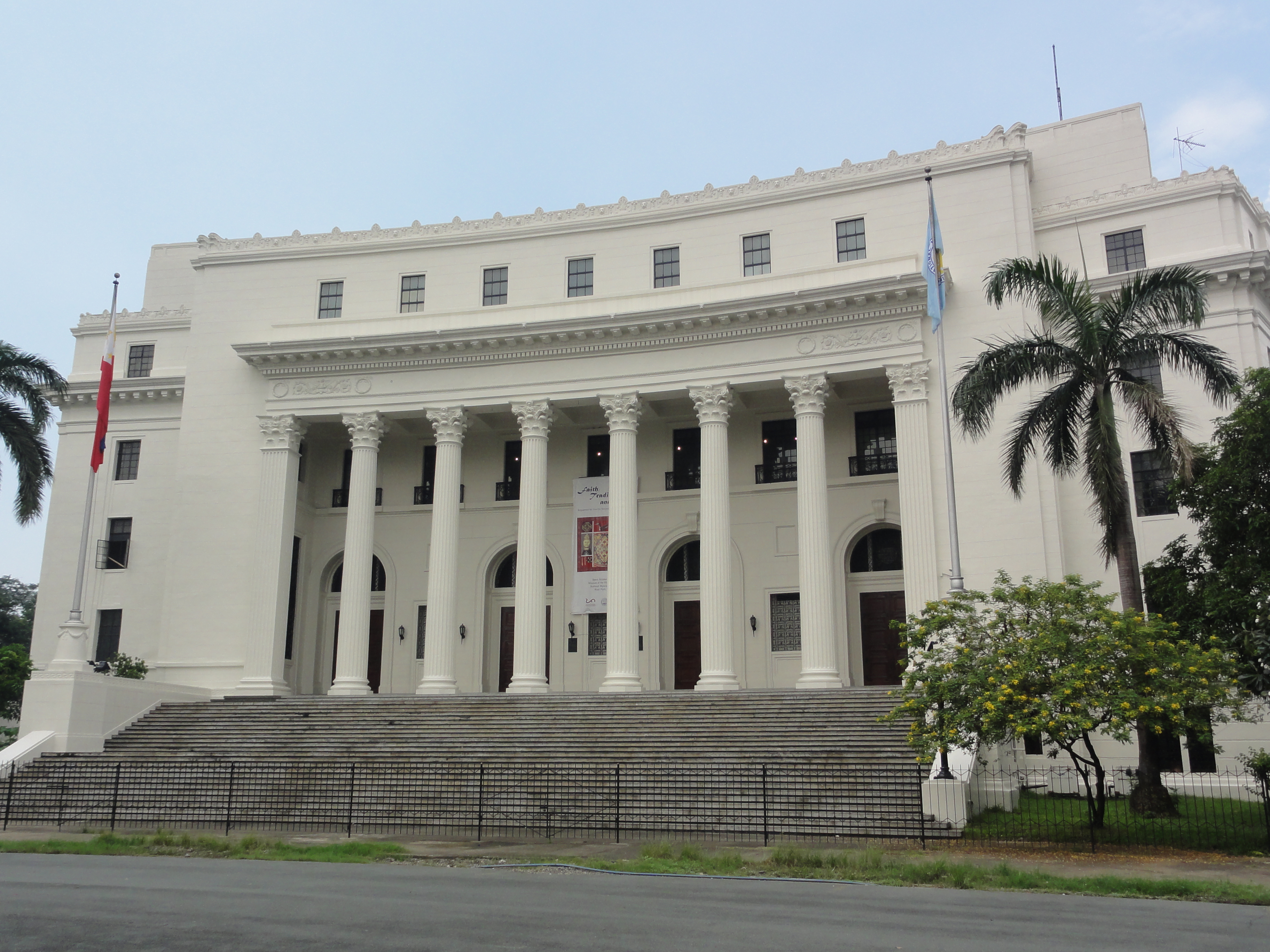
Facade of the National Museum of Anthropology in 2014

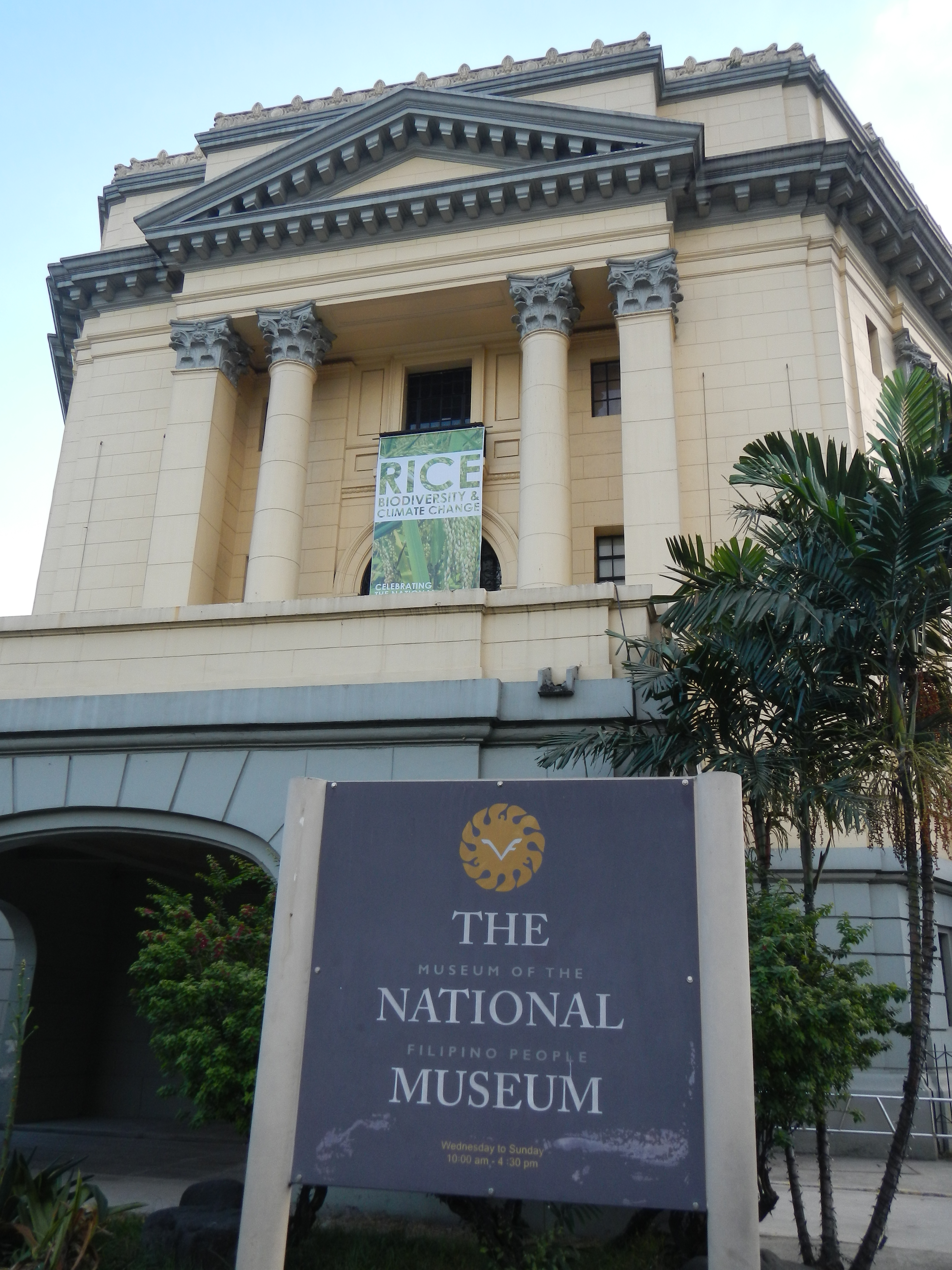
Facade of the Museum of the Filipino People (before renovation)

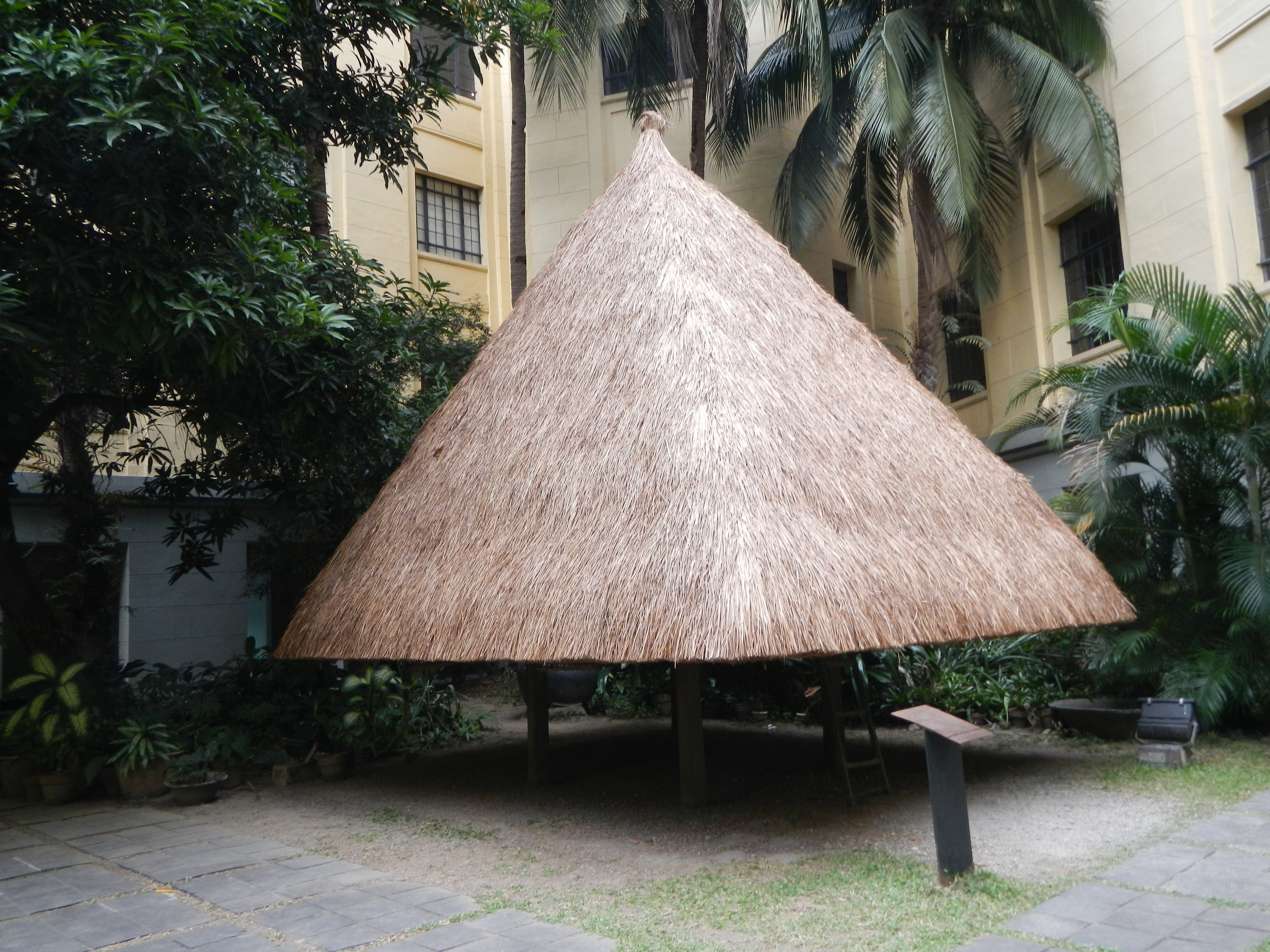
A model of an Ifugao house in the courtyard of the building

== See also ==
- National Museum of the Philippines
