= National Museum of Natural History (Manila) =

Natural history museum in Manila, Philippines

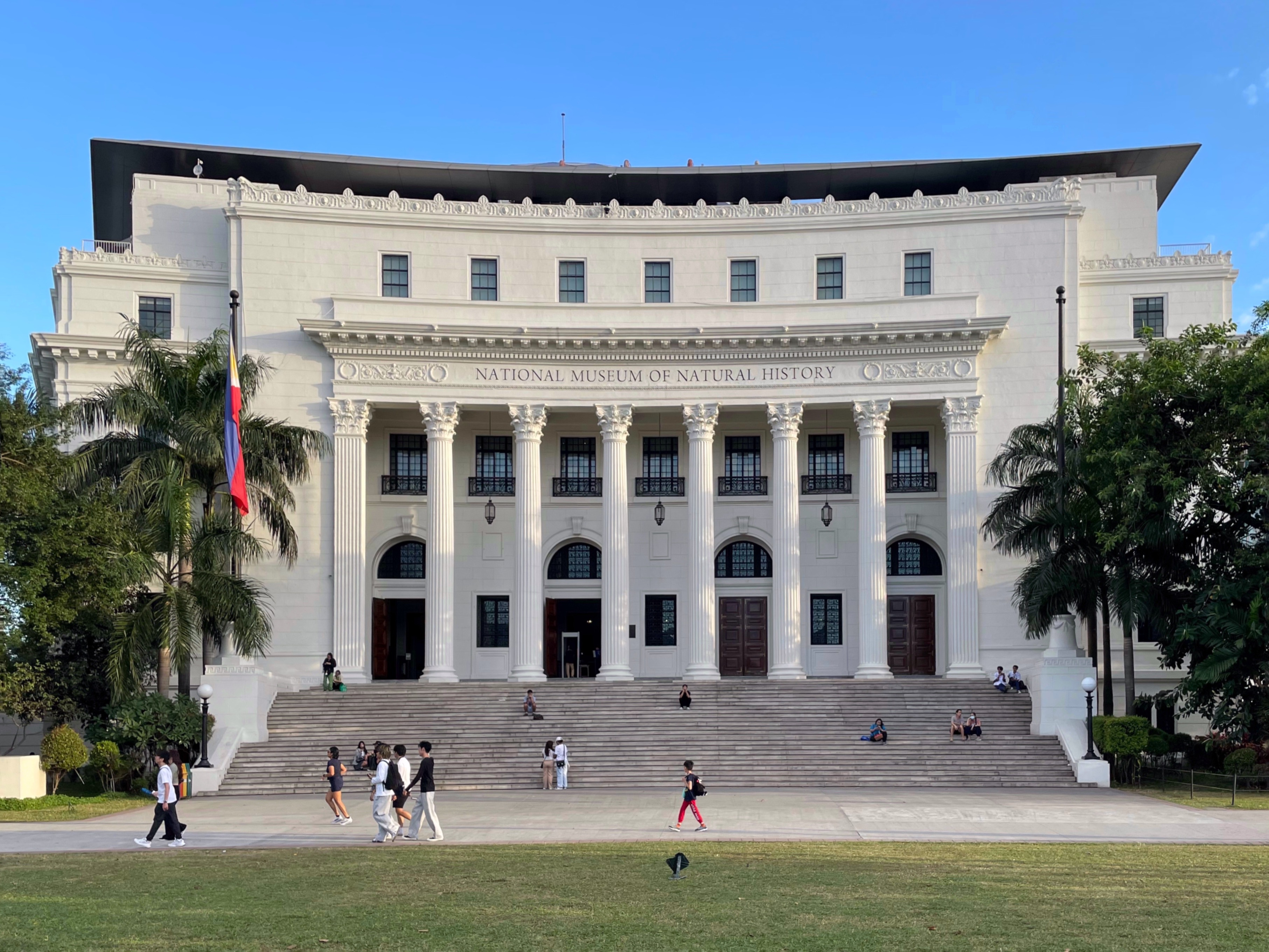
- Façade of the museum
- Established: 2017
- Coordinates: 14°34′59.9″N 120°58′55.9″E
- Type: Natural history museum
- Public transit access: United Nations; 6 17 United Nations Avenue
- Website: www.nationalmuseum.gov.ph/our-museums/national-museum-of-natural-history/

National Museum of the Philippines
- National Museum of Fine Arts; National Museum of Anthropology; National Museum of Natural History; National Planetarium
- Building details
- Former names: Agriculture and Commerce Building; Department of Tourism Building

General information
- Status: Open
- Architectural style: Neoclassical
- Location: Rizal Park, Ermita, T.M. Kalaw Street corner General Luna Street, Manila, Philippines
- Completed: 1941
- Renovated: 2015–2018
- Renovation cost: ₱1 billion

Technical details
- Floor count: 6

Design and construction
- Architect: Antonio Manalac Toledo

Renovating team
- Renovating firm: Dominic Galicia Architects
- Other designers: Tina Periquet (Interior design)

The National Museum of Natural History (Filipino: Pambansang Museo ng Likas na Kasaysayan) is the national natural history museum of the Philippines. It is located along Agrifina Circle in Rizal Park, Manila.

== History ==
=== Agriculture and Commerce Building ===
The building was constructed as the Agriculture and Commerce Building in 1940. It was designed in the Neoclassical style by Filipino architect Antonio Manalac Toledo in the late 1930s, having the same dimensions and floor plan as its twin building located at the side of the circle, the Finance Building. Both buildings were destroyed in the Battle of Manila during World War II. Both buildings were reconstructed according to the original plans after the war.

=== Department of Tourism ===
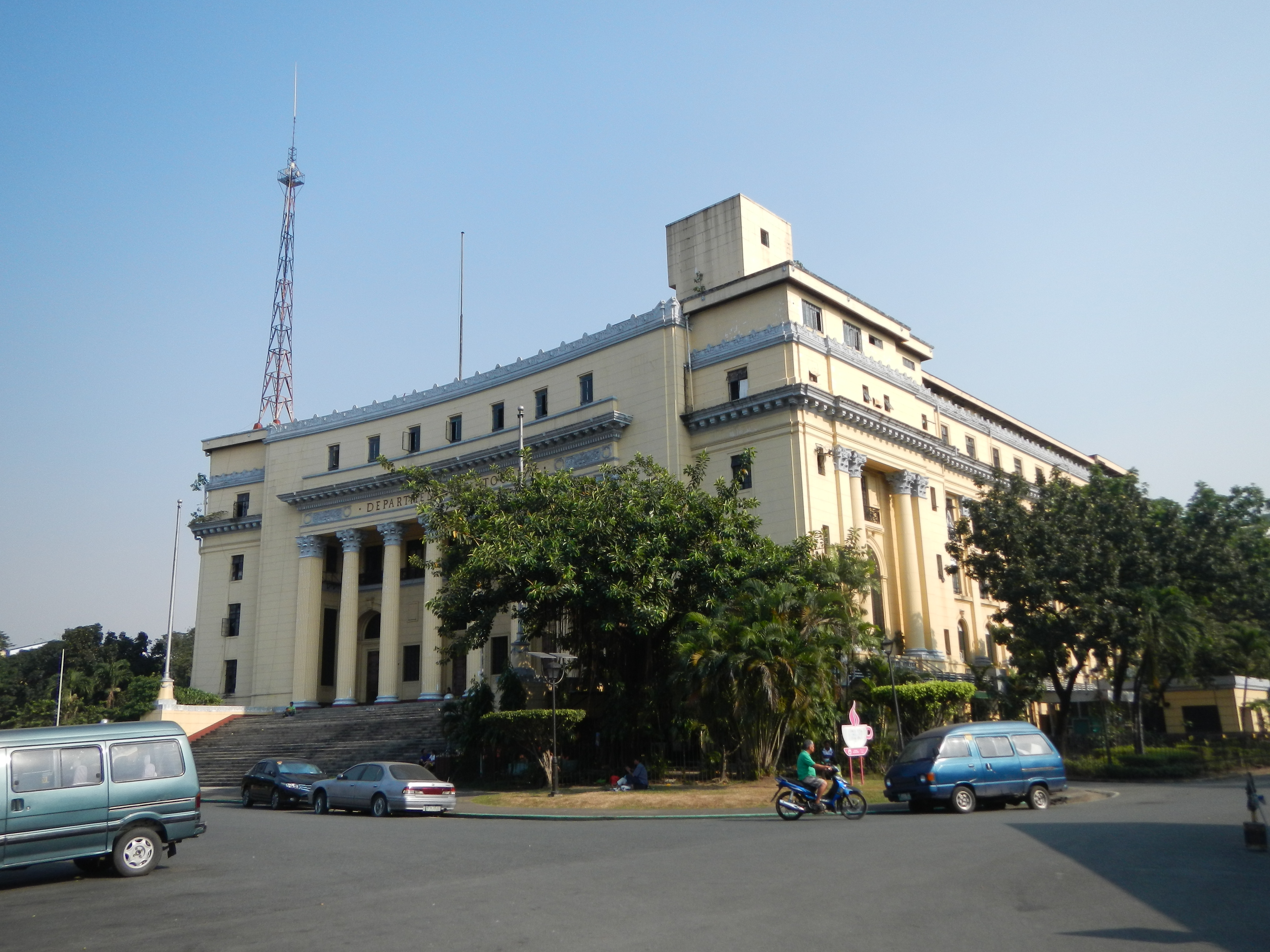
The building when it was still occupied by the Department of Tourism

At some point in time, the building was occupied by the Department of Tourism (DOT), hence the building became known as the Department of Tourism Building up until 2015. DOT moved its offices to the nearby city of Makati and is planning to return to Manila after the completion of its proposed headquarters located in Intramuros.

=== National Museum of Natural History ===
The National Museum Act, which was passed in 1998, mandates the conversion of three civic buildings within Rizal Park, the Legislative Building, the Finance Building, and the Tourism Building, into museums. The Finance Building was the first to be repurposed. In 1998, the building was converted into the National Museum of Anthropology. The Legislative Building was converted into the National Museum of Fine Arts in 2000. The Tourism Building would later become the National Museum of Natural History.

In 2013, preparations were commenced to have the building host the National Museum of Natural History. The administration of President Benigno Aquino III officially launched and backed the formation and establishment of the Museum of Natural History, as well as various regional museums throughout the country. The National Museum of the Philippines invited five architects to submit proposals for the retrofitting and chose the design of the team from Dominic Galicia Architects and interior designer Tina Periquet. Galicia's design involved the maintenance of the building's facade except for the addition of a glass dome supported by a double helix structure inspired by DNA. The dome and supporting structure were dubbed as the "Tree of Life" and will cover the courtyard of the six-storey building. The project, estimated to cost around ₱1 billion, was initially scheduled to be completed in 2015 in time for the 2015 APEC Summit.

A bidding for prospective contractors for the renovation of the building was done in September 2015.

The National Museum of Natural History was officially inaugurated on September 30, 2017. A grand opening for the museum was expected in the later quarter of 2017. The museum opened on May 18, 2018.

== Collections ==
The museum's collections include the stuffed remains of Lolong, a saltwater crocodile captured in Agusan del Sur in 2011 and the largest crocodile in captivity at the time of his death in 2013.

== Gallery ==
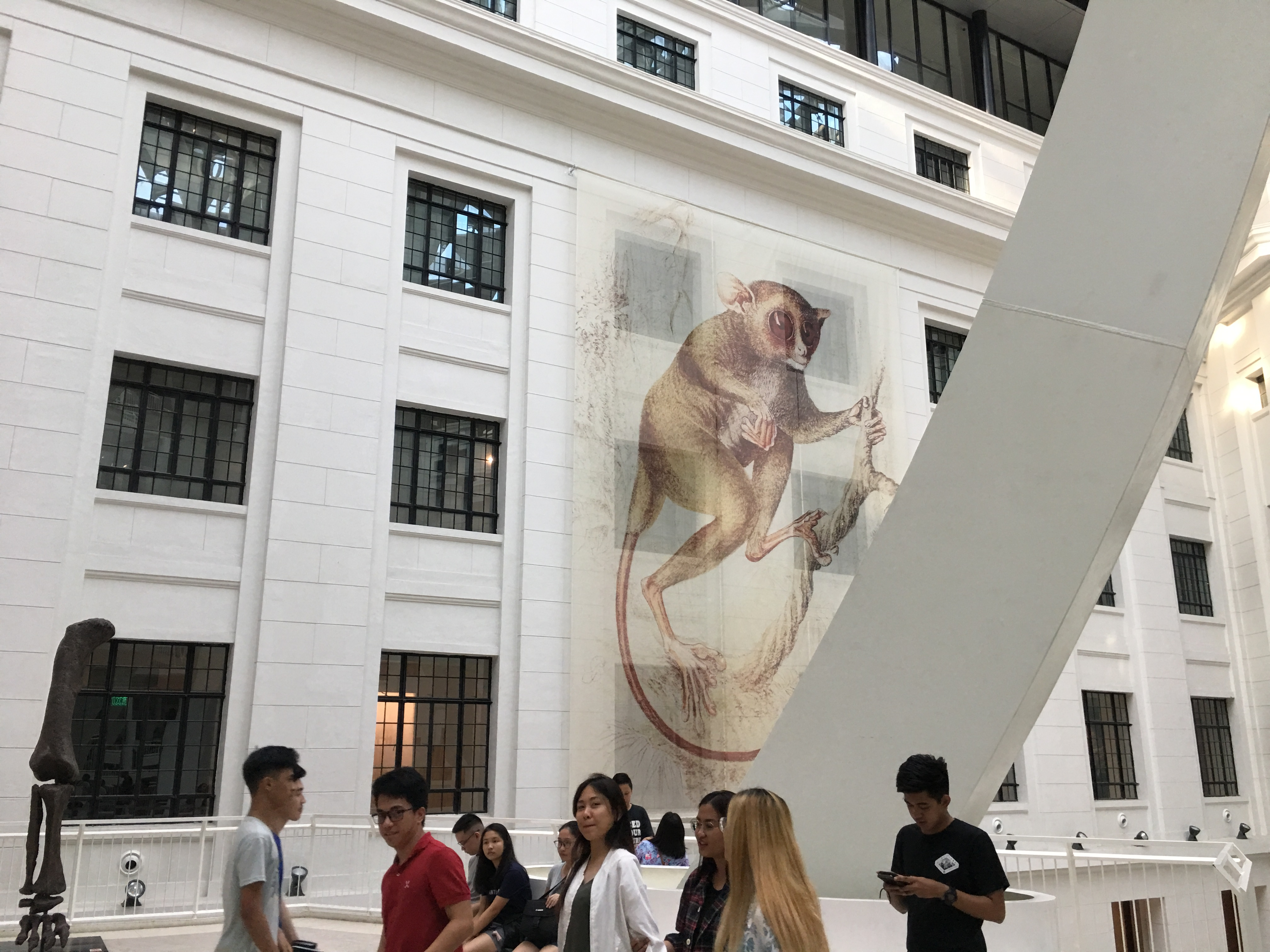
Tarsier

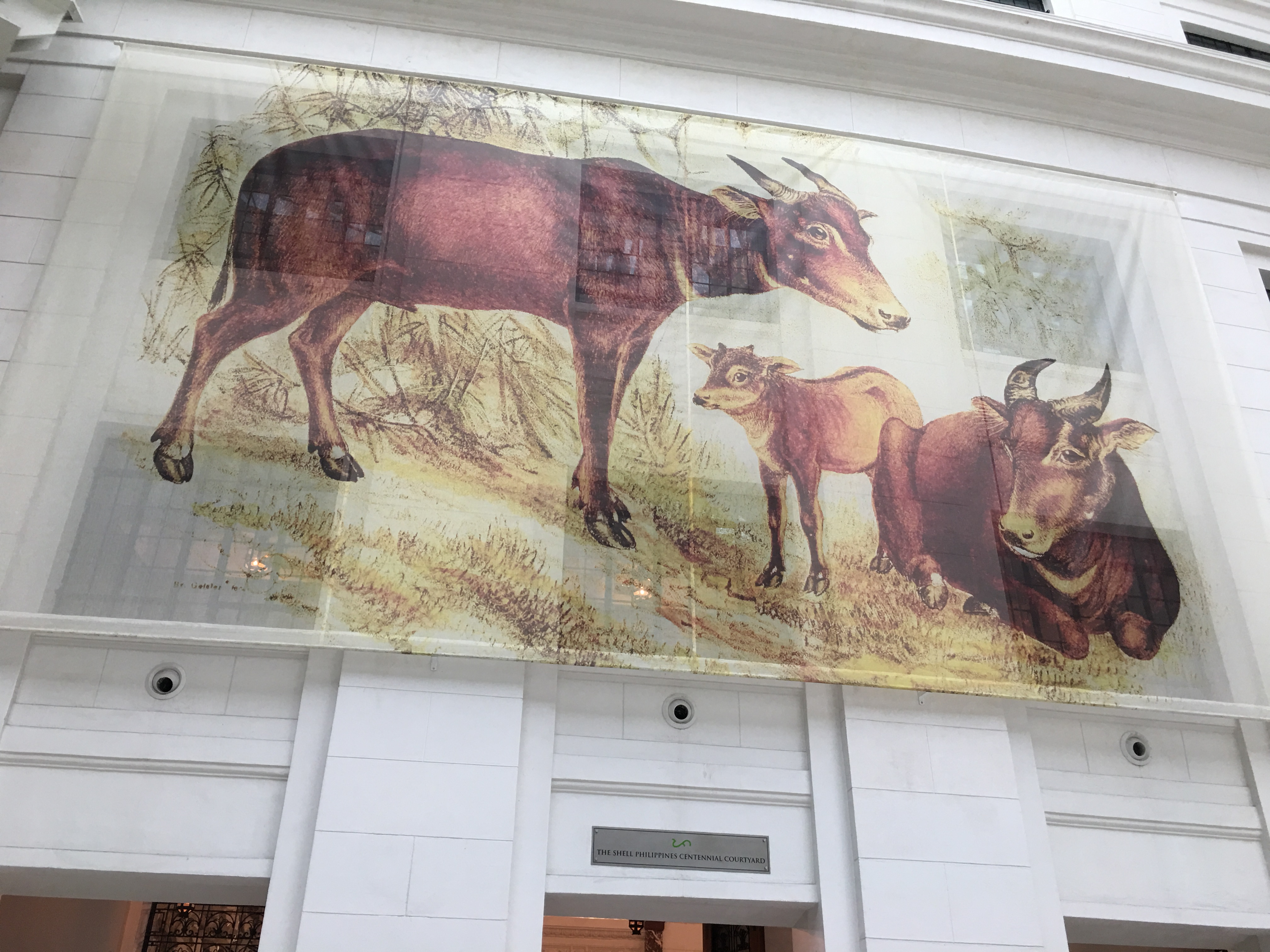
Tamaraw

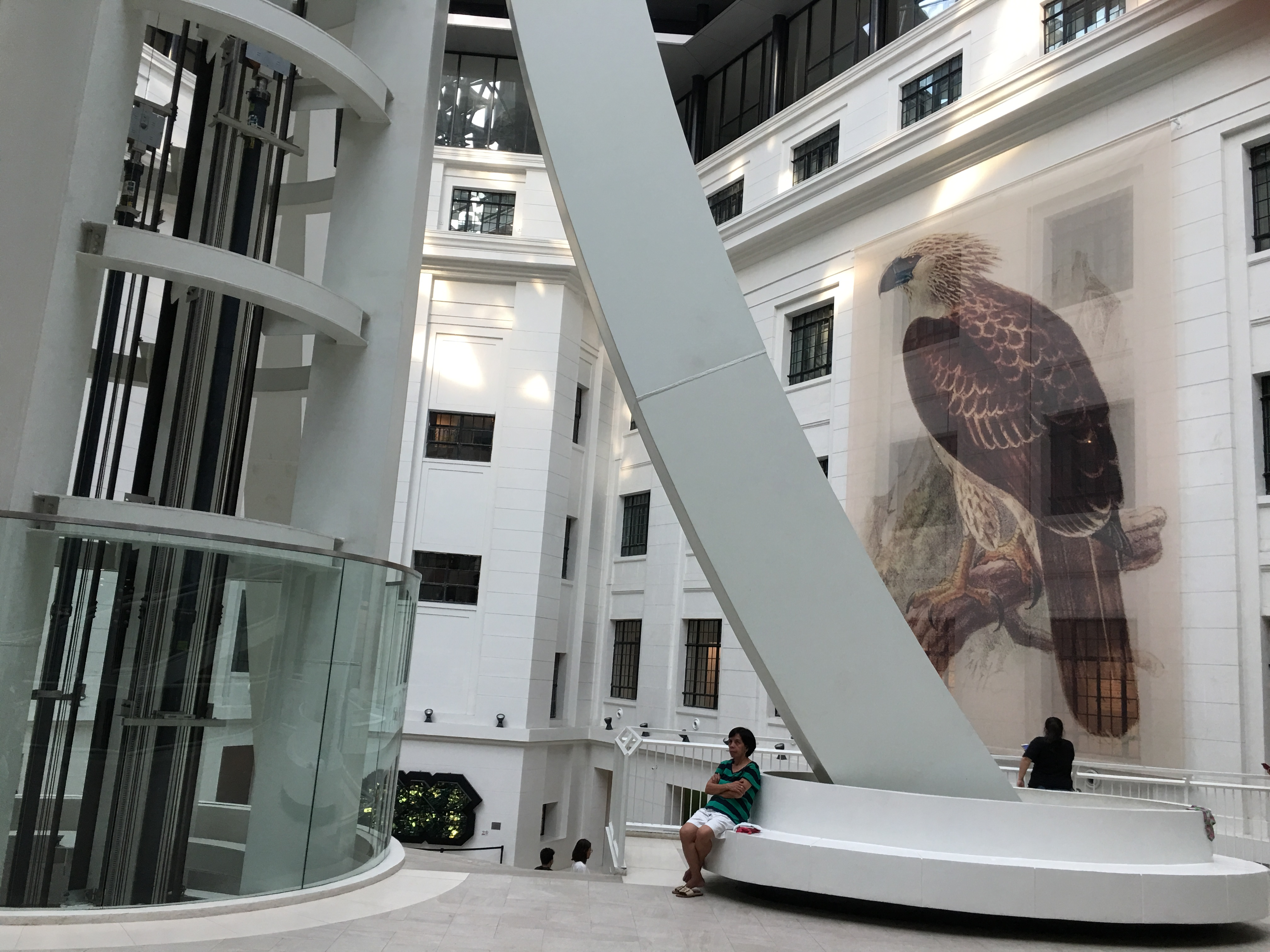
Philippine Eagle

Tree of Life

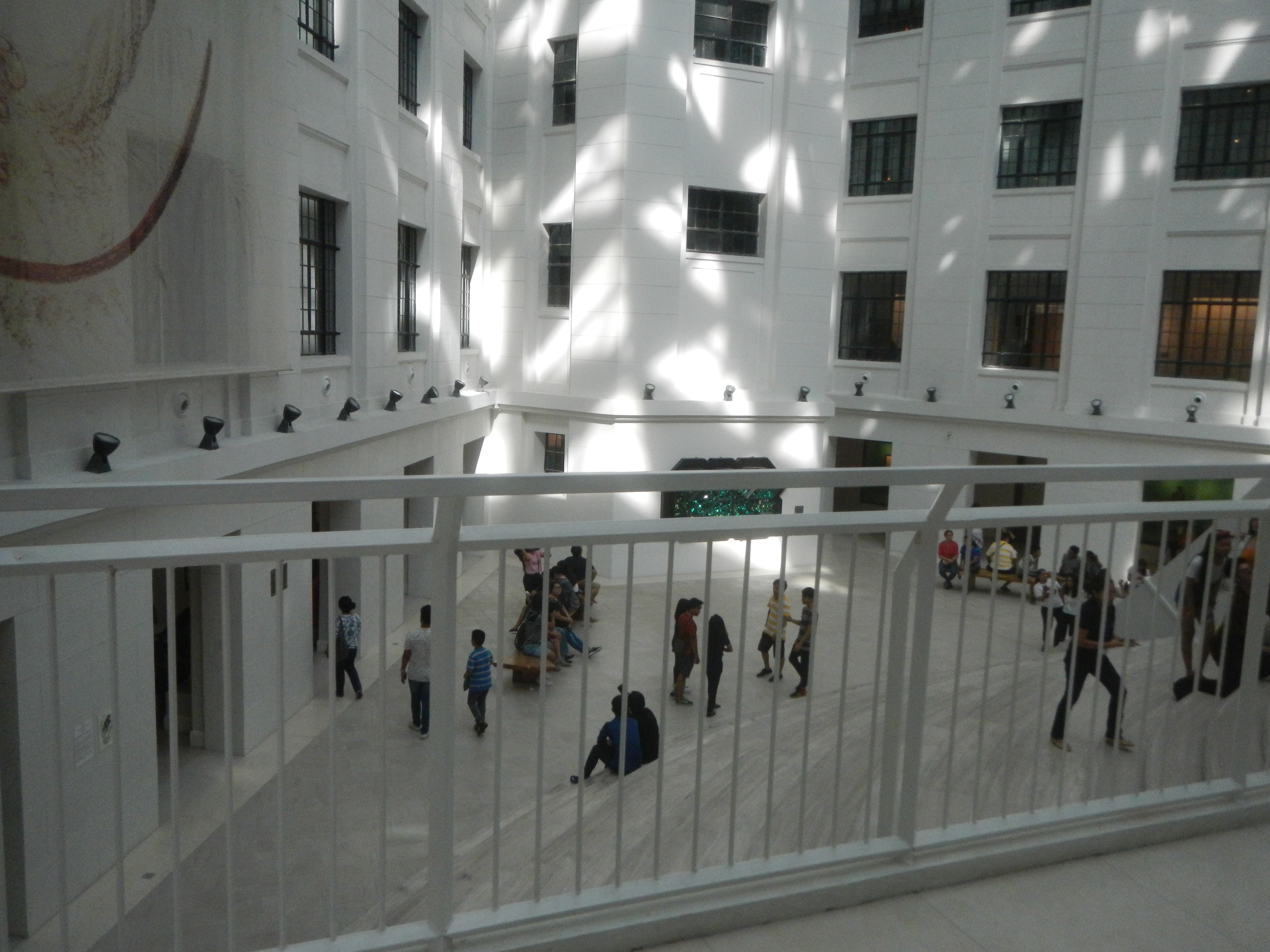
Ground level

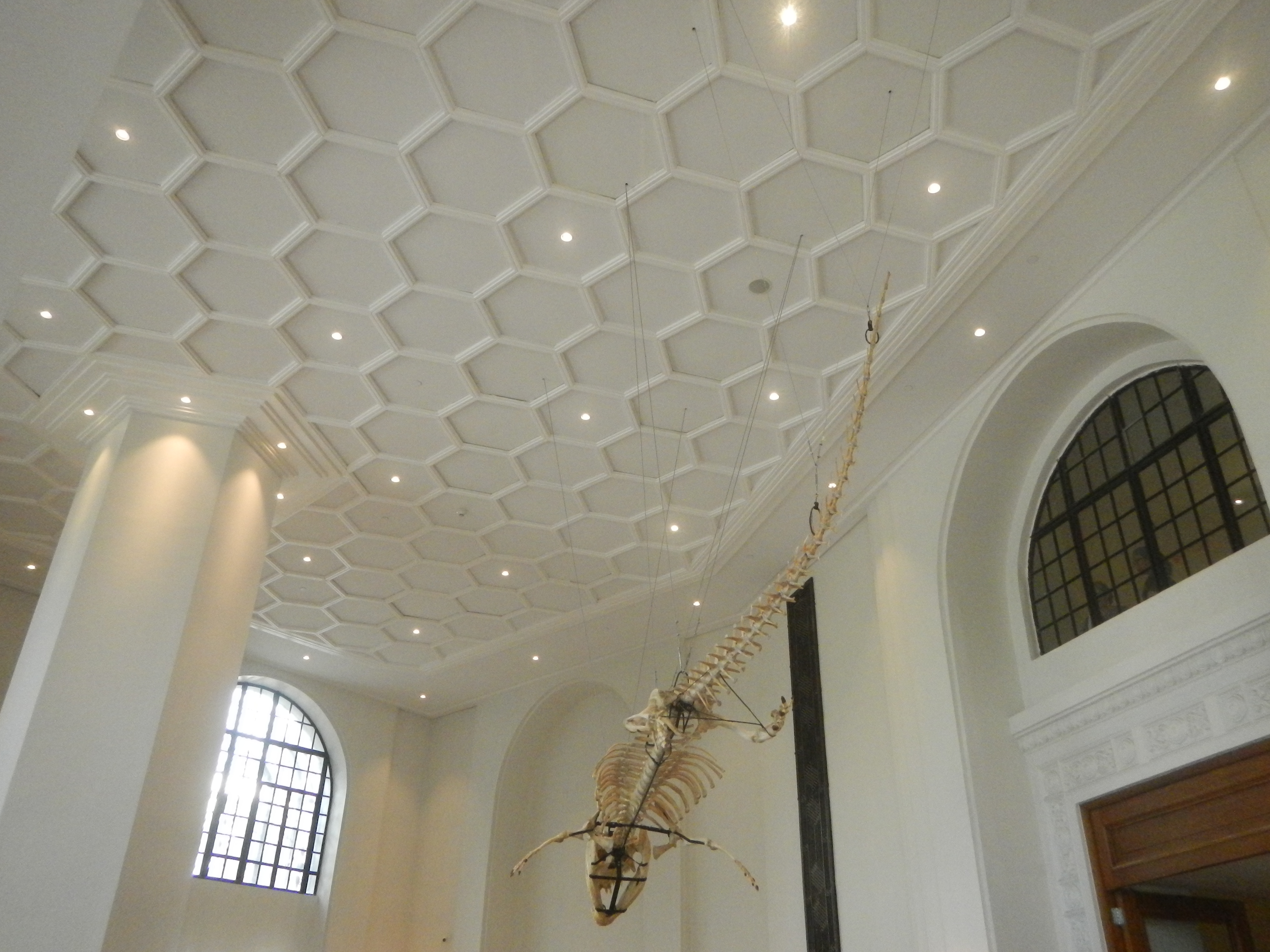
Skeletal remains of Lolong

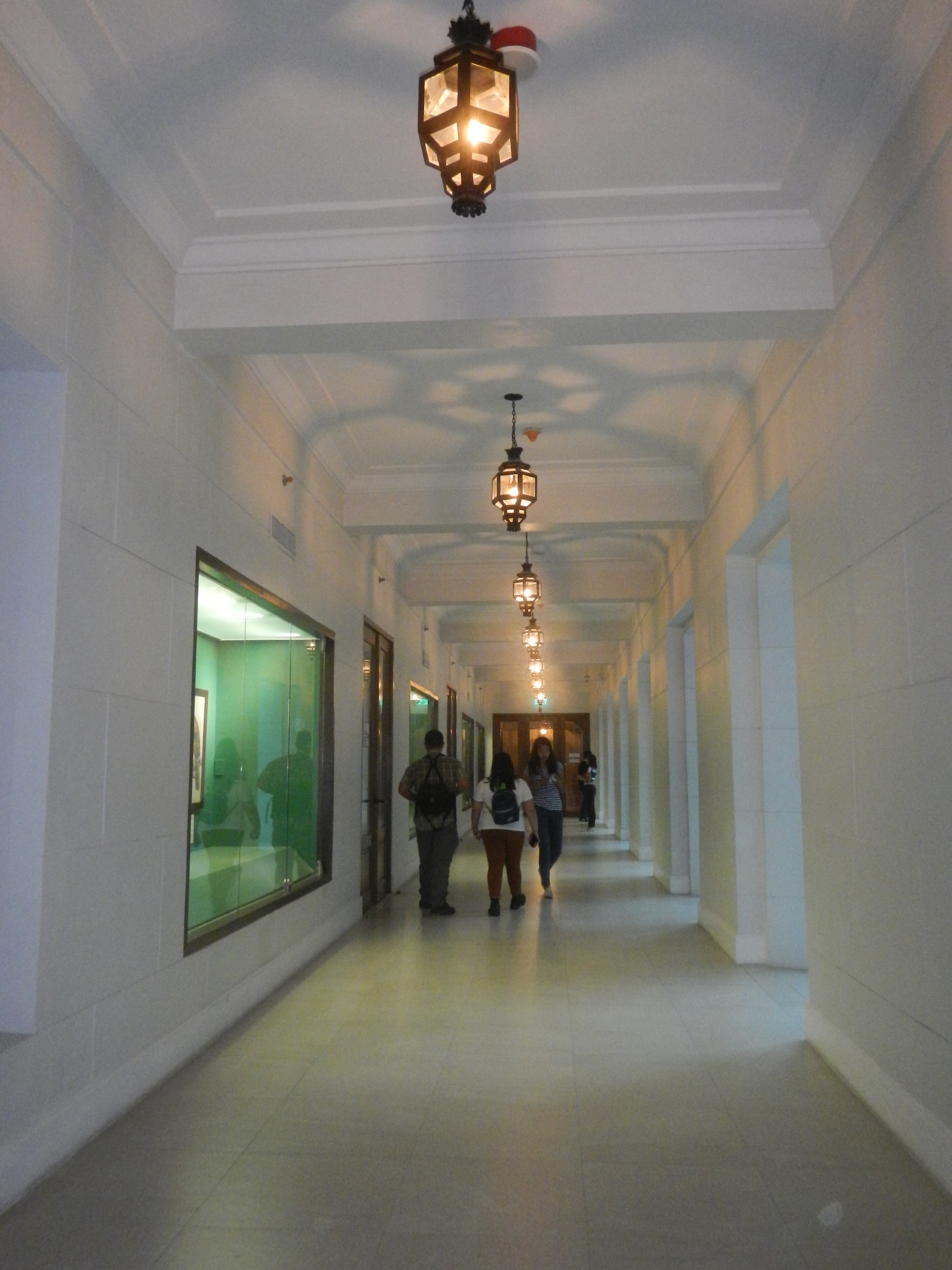
A museum hallway

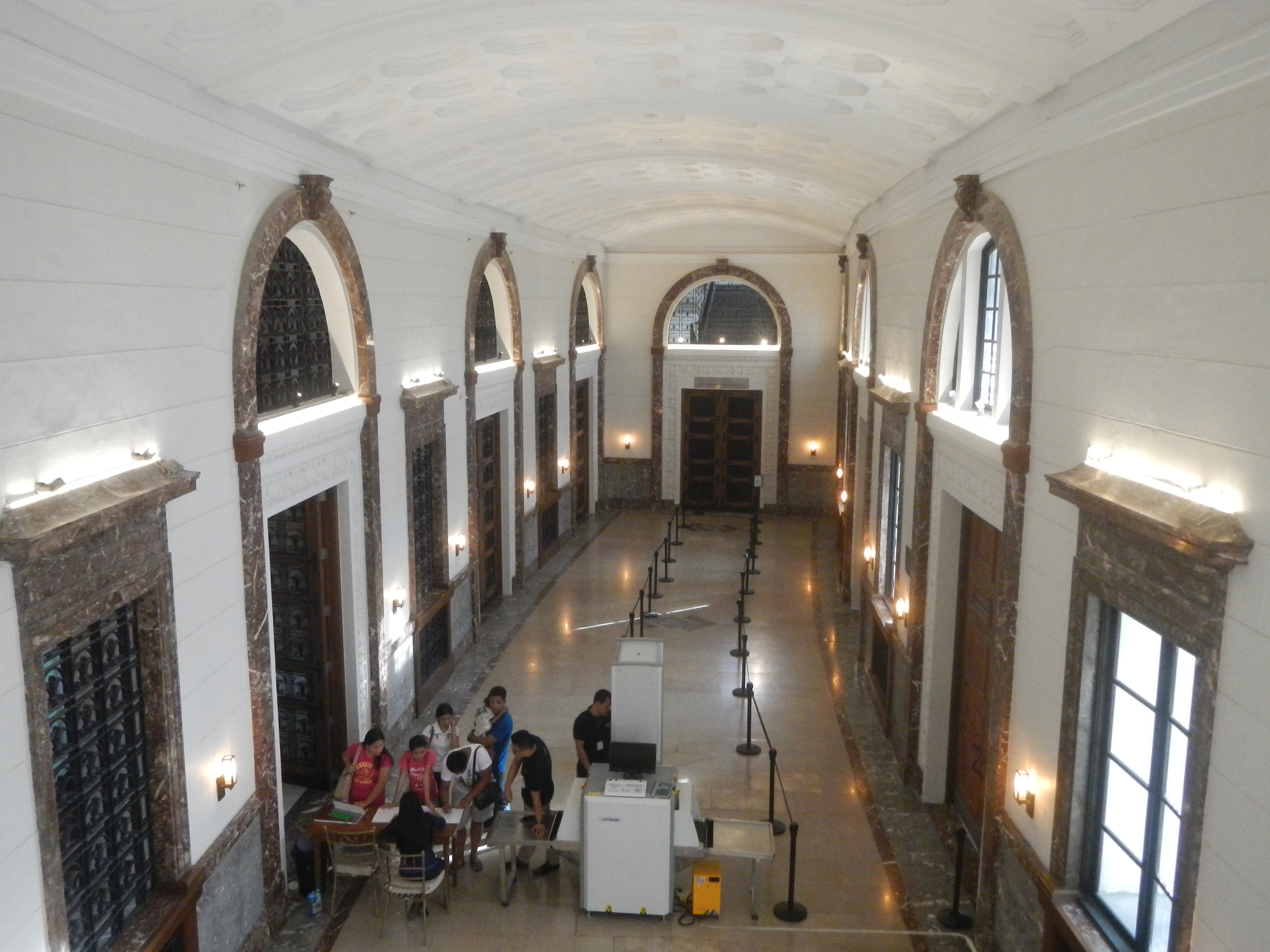
Lobby

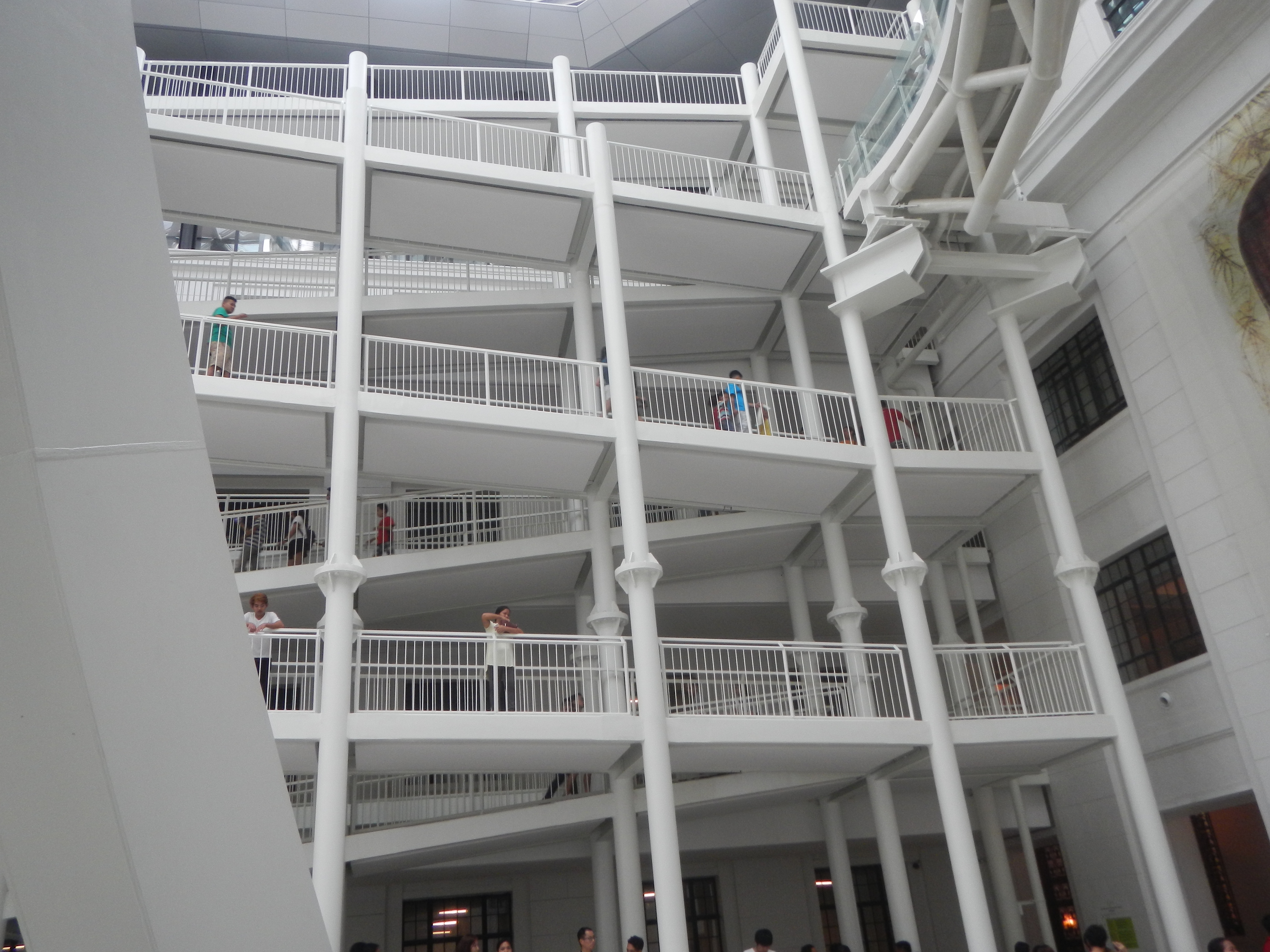
Ramps

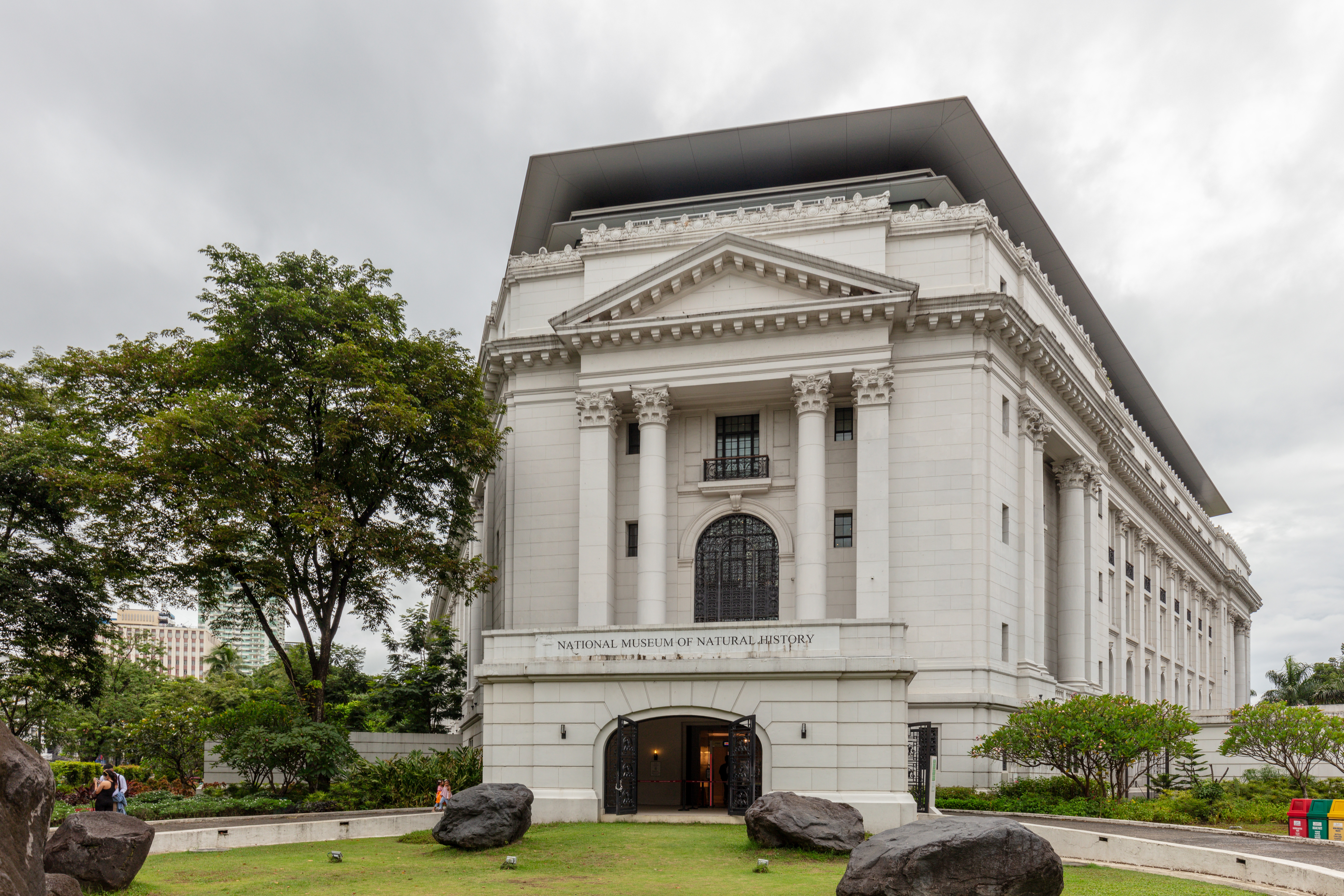
View towards southwest of the museum

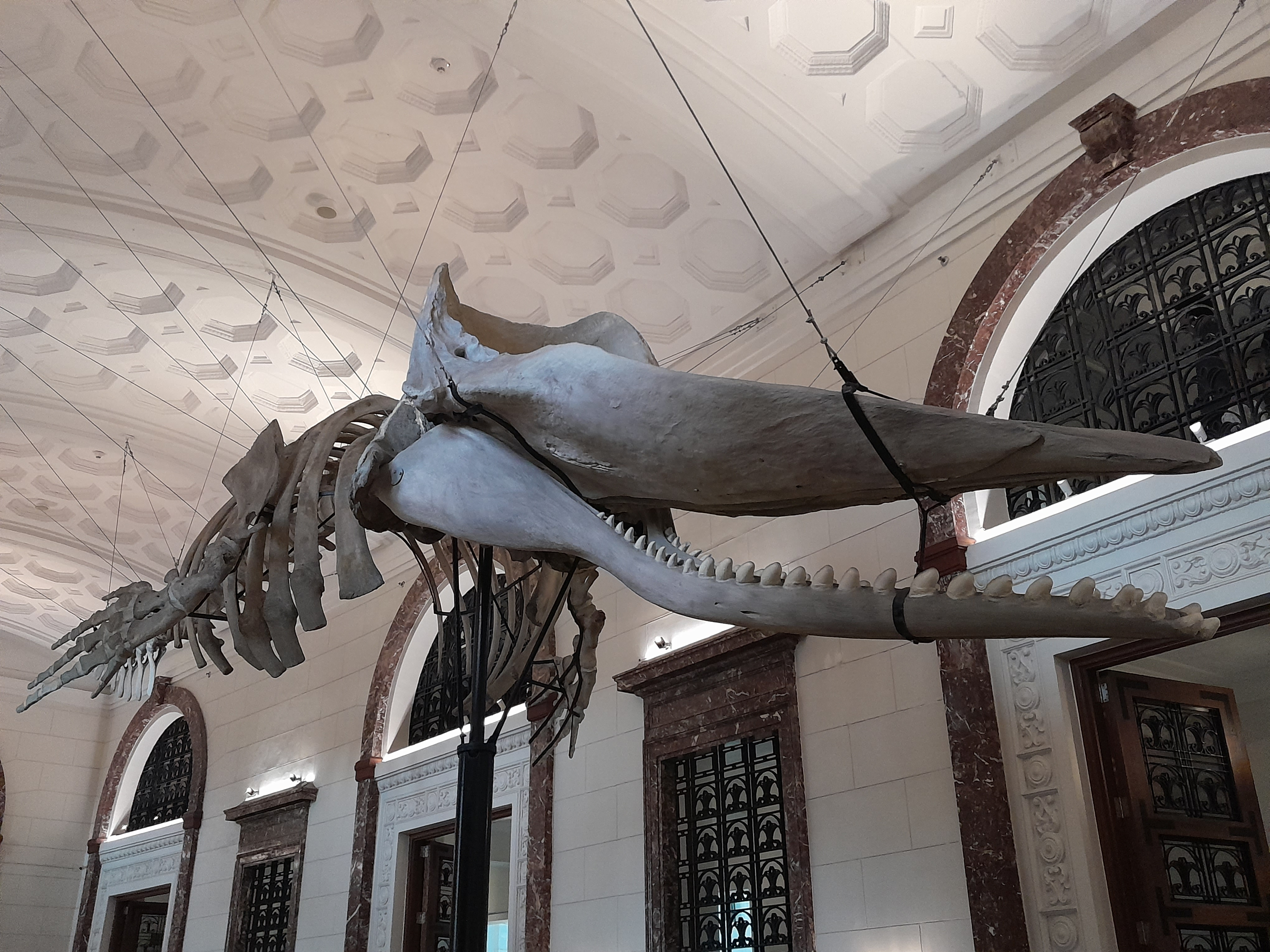
Marinduque Sperm Whale

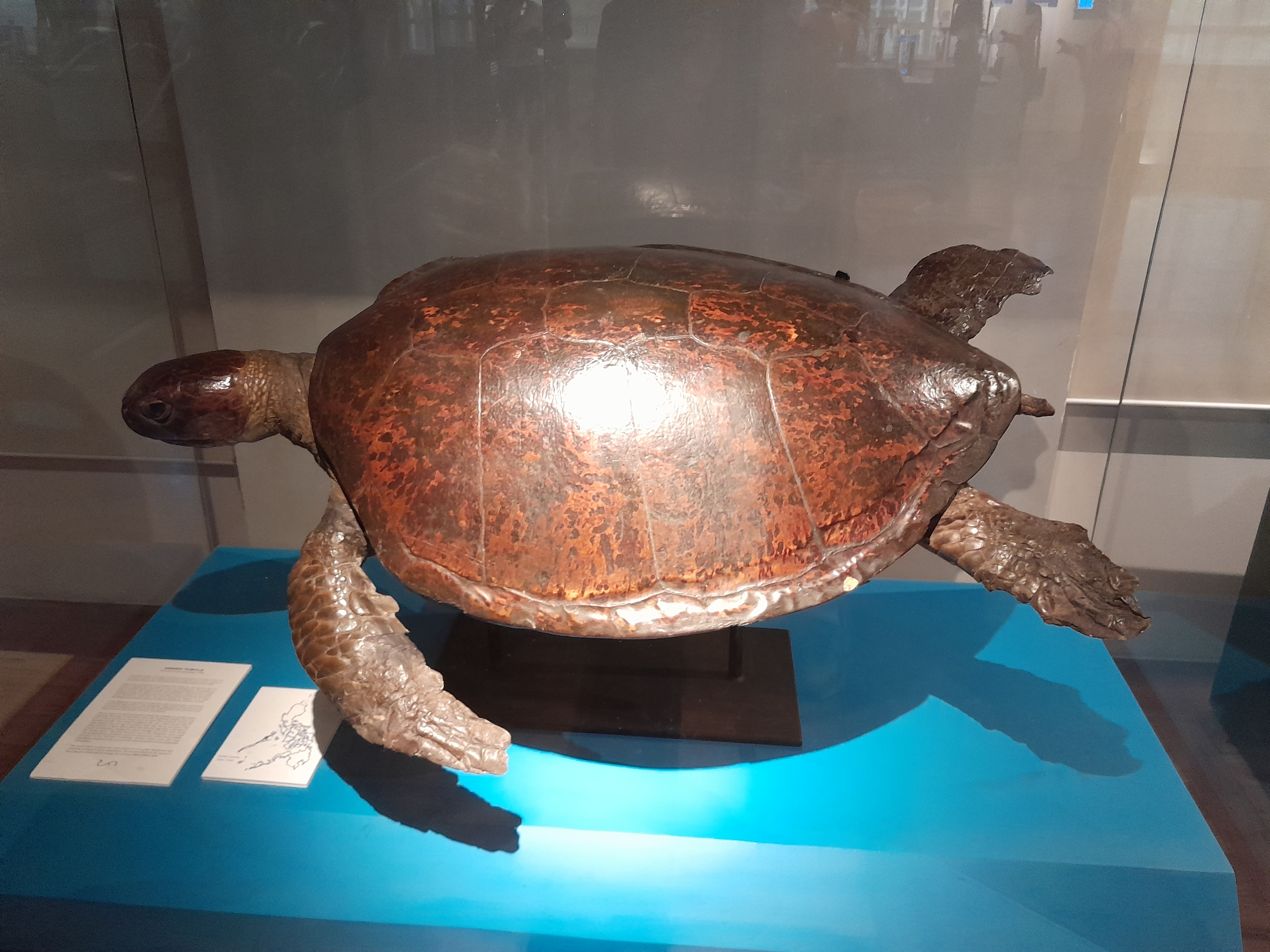
Philippine Turtle
