= National Planetarium (Manila) =

Former establishment in the Philippines

- Pambansang Planetaryo (Filipino)

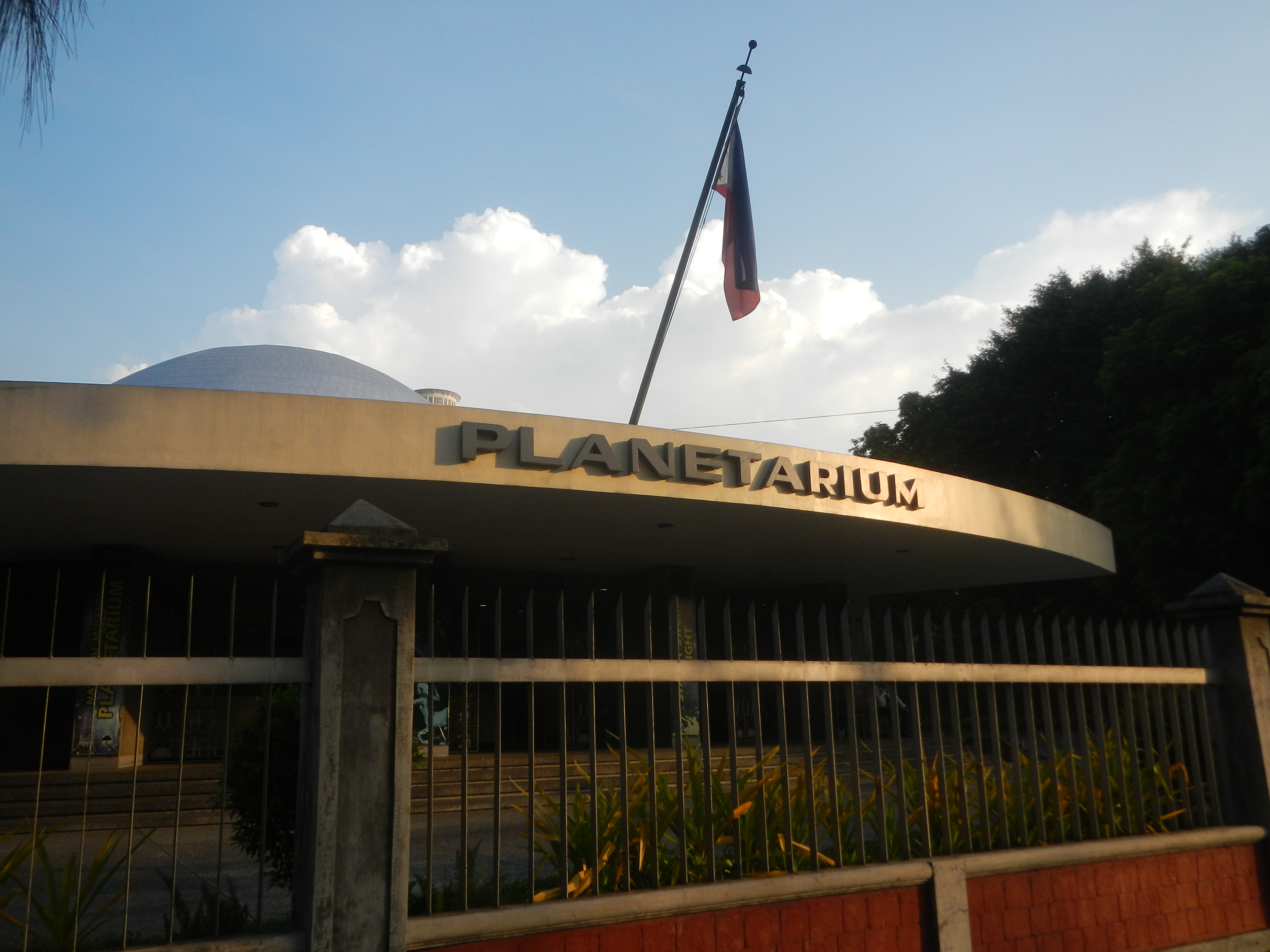
- Established: September 30, 1975
- Coordinates: 14°35′02″N 120°58′41″E
- Type: Planetarium
- Owner: National Museum of the Philippines

National Museum of the Philippines
- National Museum of Fine Arts; National Museum of Anthropology; National Museum of Natural History; National Planetarium
- Building details

General information
- Status: Completed
- Location: Rizal Park, Ermita, 565 Padre Burgos Avenue, Manila, Philippines
- Construction started: 1974
- Inaugurated: October 8, 1975
- Closed: October 11, 2021
- Cost: US$100,000

The National Planetarium (Filipino: Pambansang Planetaryo), also known as the National Museum Planetarium (shortened as NM Planetarium), was a planetarium owned and operated by the National Museum of the Philippines in Manila. It was a 16-meter (52 ft) dome located in Rizal Park between the Japanese Garden and Chinese Garden on Padre Burgos Avenue in the central district of Ermita. It opened on October 8, 1975.

== History ==
The building of a space museum in Rizal Park was proposed by Philippine Weather Bureau chief and Philippine Astronomical Society founder Maximo Sacro Jr. to National Museum Director Godofredo Alcasid Sr. in 1970. It was presented to then National Parks and Development Committee chair and First Lady Imelda Marcos who approved the project and immediately instructed the Bureau of Public Works to prepare plans for the building. Construction of the building began in 1974 with help from Japanese engineers. The planetarium cost US$100,000 to build with funding provided by the Japanese government as part of its war reparation to the Philippines. Presidential Decree No. 804-A was signed by then President Ferdinand Marcos on September 30, 1975 which formally established the National Planetarium. The building was formally inaugurated on October 8, 1975 with Maximo Sacro Jr. as its first curator.

The National Planetarium was closed in late 2018 and was reopened in January 2019 after two months of renovation. It was closed from April 2020 until July 2021 due to the COVID-19 pandemic. The planetarium's closure was announced on October 11, 2021 to give way for the "decommissioning" of the planetarium building. The administration also disclosed that a plan for a "new National Planetarium" is under development.

As of 2022, the former National Planetarium building currently houses headquarters of the National Parks Development Committee, the government agency attached to the Department of Tourism with the mandate of administering Rizal Park, where the national planetarium structure is located.

== Museum exhibits and facilities ==
The National Planetarium was 16-meter (52 ft) high and had a seating capacity of 310. It was equipped with a GM-15-S Goto starball projector acquired in 1975. It featured four daily regular shows and a permanent exhibit in the main building featuring paintings of Philippine astronomical myths and beliefs and diorama representations of the Solar System, major constellations and astronomists.

In 2012, the National Planetarium had more than 40,000 visitors, mostly students from Metro Manila and nearby provinces. Its exhibition drew over 2,000 visitors.
