= National Museum of the Philippines =

Umbrella government organization

National Museum of the Philippines Pambansang Museo ng Pilipinas
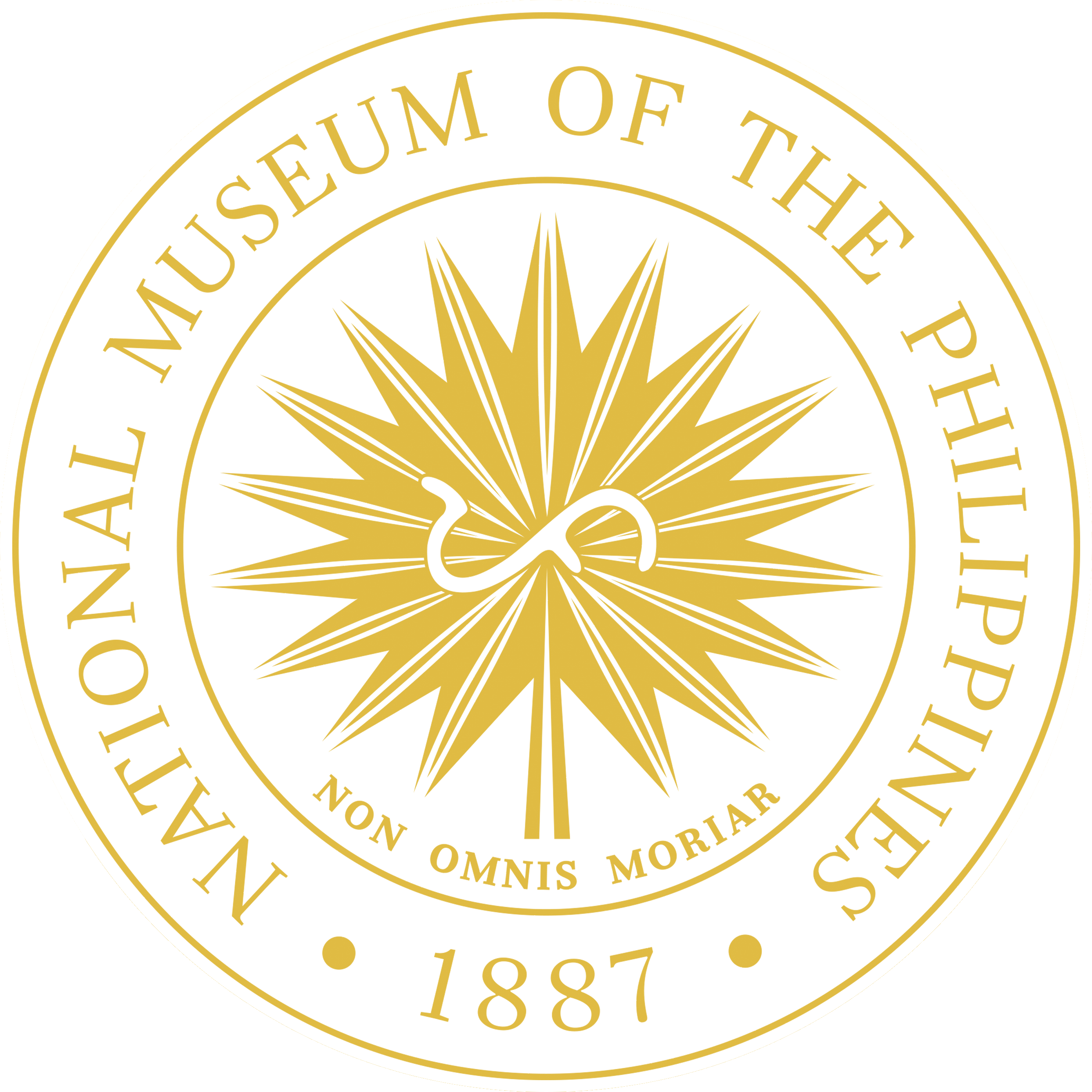
- Seal

- Logo

Agency overview
- Formed: October 29, 1901
- Preceding Agency: Museo-Biblioteca de Filipinas
- Jurisdiction: Philippine arts and cultural development
- Headquarters: National Museum of Fine Arts, Padre Burgos Avenue, Rizal Park, Ermita, Manila, Philippines; 14°35′12″N 120°58′52″E
- Motto: Non omnis moriar (Latin)
- Employees: 387 (2024)
- Annual budget: ₱537.44 million (2021)
- Agency executives: Jeremy R. Barns, Director general; Andoni M. Aboitiz, Chairperson of the board of trustees
- Parent department: Department of Education; National Commission for Culture and the Arts
- Website: nationalmuseum.gov.ph

The National Museum of the Philippines (Filipino: Pambansang Museo ng Pilipinas) is an umbrella government organization that oversees a number of national museums in the Philippines, including ethnographic, anthropological, archaeological, and visual arts collections.

From 1973 to 2021, it served as the regulatory and enforcement agency of the government of the Philippines for the restoration and safeguarding of significant cultural properties, sites, and reservations throughout the country. This mandate was then transferred to the National Commission for Culture and the Arts (NCCA), which now serves as the National Museum's parent agency. For policy and program coordination, the National Museum is also an attached agency of the Department of Education (DepEd).

The National Museum operates the National Museum of Fine Arts, National Museum of Anthropology, and the National Museum of Natural History, all located in the National Museum Complex in Manila. It previously operated the National Planetarium until its closure in 2021.

The National Museum has established and operates museums and cultural sites across the Philippines, including Batanes, Bicol, Bohol, Butuan, Cagayan, Cebu, Cordillera, Davao, Dumaguete, Ilocos, Iloilo, Kabayan, Marinduque, Rizal, Sulu, the Tabon Caves Complex, and Zamboanga. The Ilocos museums include the Padre Burgos House and Old Carcel (Provicial Jail), while the Iloilo museums include the former Iloilo Provincial Jail and Old Jaro Municipal Hall.

== History ==
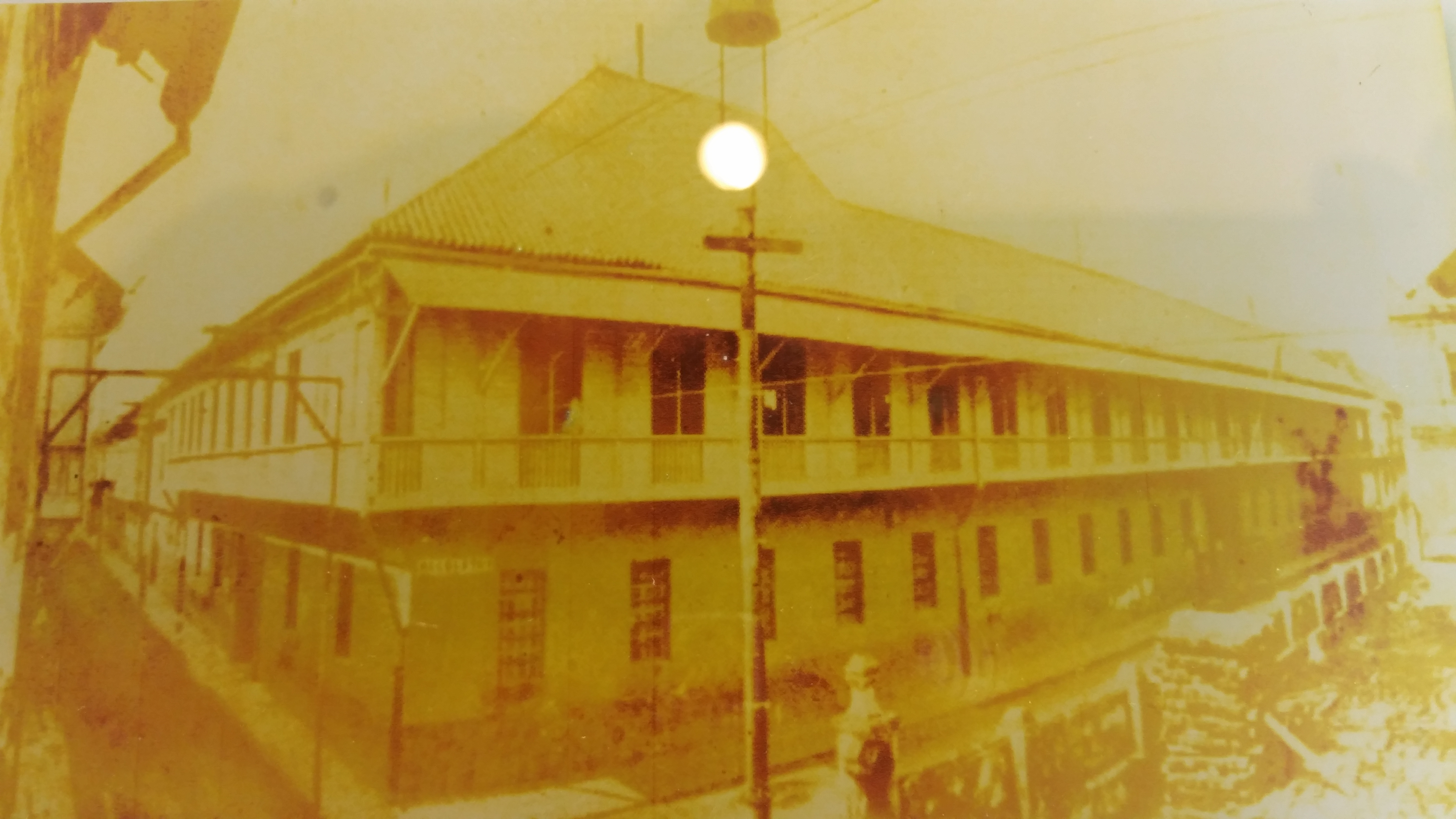
Casa de la Moneda, which hosted the museum library of the Museo-Biblioteca de Filipinas.

=== Spanish era ===
The first predecessor to the current National Museum of the Philippines was the Museo-Biblioteca de Filipinas, which was established by royal decree by the Spanish colonial government in the Philippines on August 12, 1887. Its first museum library opened at the Casa de la Moneda, along Cabildo Street, on October 24, 1891. It later moved to a building along Gunao Street in Quiapo, before becoming defunct sometime around the onset of the American occupation of the Philippines, in 1900.

=== American era ===
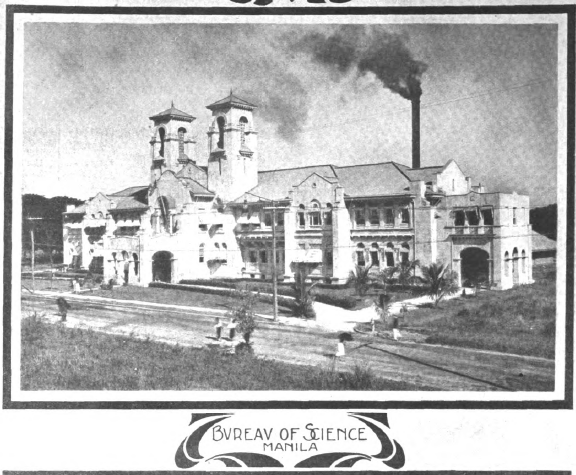
Bureau of Science building

The American-supervised Philippine Commission established the Insular Museum of Ethnology, Natural History, and Commerce under the Department of Public Instruction on October 29, 1901, through Act No. 284, to replace the museum library. The Insular Museum was founded to complement the Bureau of Non-Christian Tribes, which was later renamed as the Bureau of Ethnological Survey. After the Louisiana Purchase Exposition of 1904, the Insular Museum was renamed to the Philippine Museum. The Bureau of Ethnological Survey was abolished as a separate bureau and was reorganized as the Division of Ethnology under the Bureau of Education in 1905. It was subsequently moved to the Bureau of Science in 1906.

In 1916, the organization of the Philippine Museum underwent another overhaul. Through Act No. 2572, the Philippine Library and Museum was created through the merger of the Division of Ethnology and the Fine Arts Division of the Philippine Museum. The Philippine Museum's Natural History Division was retained under the Bureau of Science.

The National Museum of the Philippine Islands would be established on December 7, 1928, through Act No. 3477, and placed under the Department of Agriculture and Natural Resources. It was abolished in 1933 by Act No. 4007. The Division of Fine Arts was placed under the Philippine Library and Museum (now National Library of the Philippines), while the Division of Ethnology was placed under the Bureau of Science. The National Museum Division was created from the merger of the Division of Ethnology and the Natural History Division. The National Museum Division was renamed as the National History Museum Division, with the Office of the Secretary of Agriculture and Commerce named as its parent agency via Commonwealth Act No. 453, in 1939. The division was later merged to the National Library's Division of Fine Arts to become the National Museum, under the Office of the Executive Secretary.

=== World War II ===
The Japanese occupation of the Philippines during World War II brought the Natural History Museum Division and the National Library's Fine Arts Division back under a single organization, but the museum lost a large part of its collection during the Liberation of Manila of 1945, when the Old Legislative Building and the Bureau of Science Building were destroyed. The organization that resulted from the divisions' merger was named the National Museum and placed under the Office of the Executive Secretary.

=== Contemporary era ===
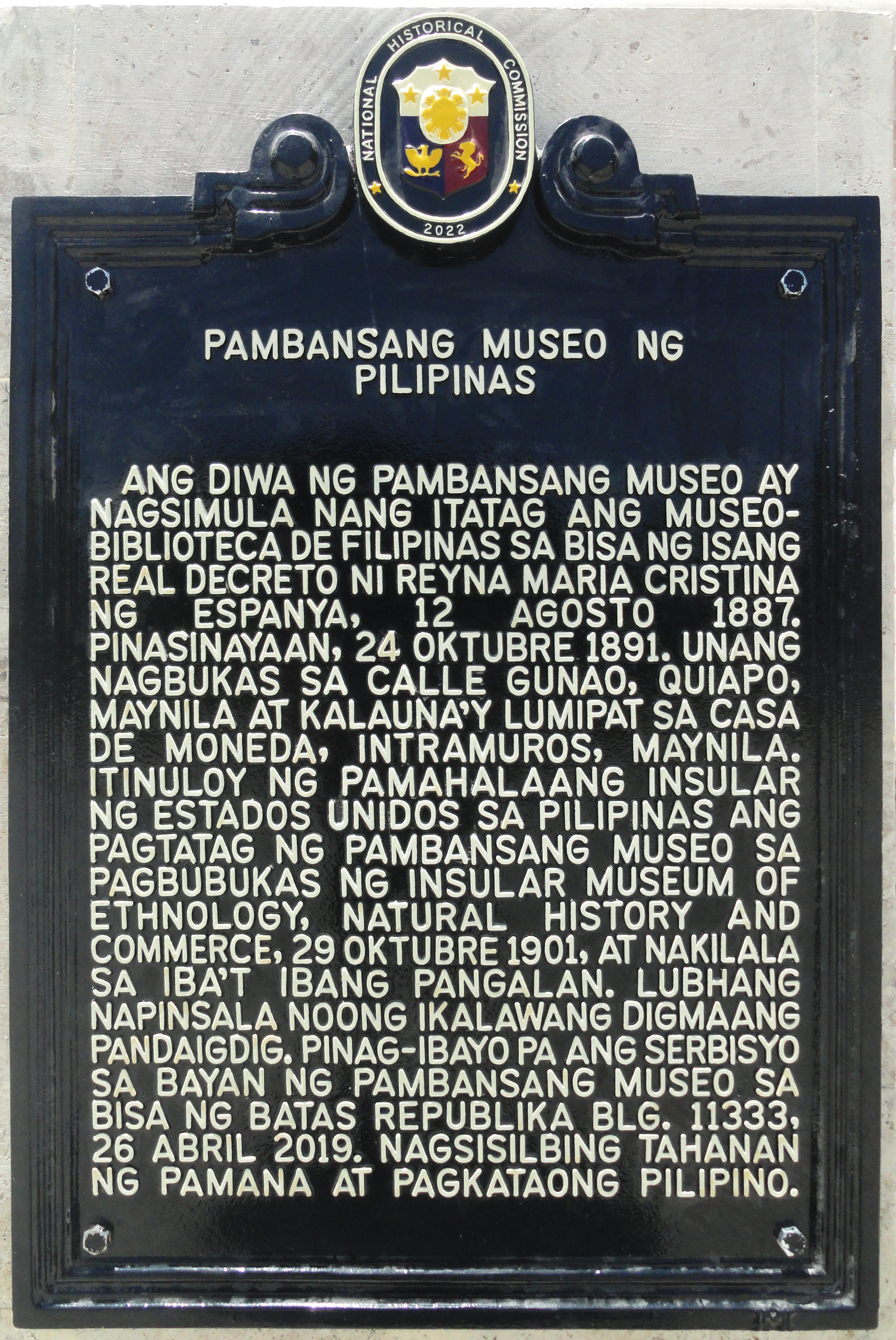
Historical marker for the institution unveiled during the 2025 International Museum Day

The museum's role in cultural growth was recognized as contributing to the government's desire for national development. In 1966, President Ferdinand Marcos signed Republic Act No. 4846, or the Cultural Properties and Protection Act. On September 12, 1991, President Cory Aquino signed Proclamation No. 798, declaring October as "Museum and Galleries Month", a celebration to be led by the National Museum, whose aims were to arouse national consciousness and pride in the Philippines' rich culture and national identity, expressed in all media of art and culture as well as historical and religious artifacts. In 2013, President Noynoy Aquino launched the construction of the National Museum of Natural History, which opened in 2018. Aquino also backed the construction and development of several regional museums, including in Batanes, Vigan, Marinduque, Bohol, and Iloilo, while supporting the heritage preservation projects of the National Museum, including the restoration of churches damaged by natural calamities, such as in Cebu, Bohol, and Eastern Samar.

From 2013 to 2015, entry to museums administered by the National Museum was made free in cooperation with the Aquino government; this policy became permanent in 2016. In 2019, President Rodrigo Duterte changed the agency's name from National Museum to National Museum of the Philippines through Republic Act No. 11333.

In 2025, the museum extended its opening hours to include all seven days of the week, having previously been closed on Mondays.

== Museums ==
=== Central museums ===
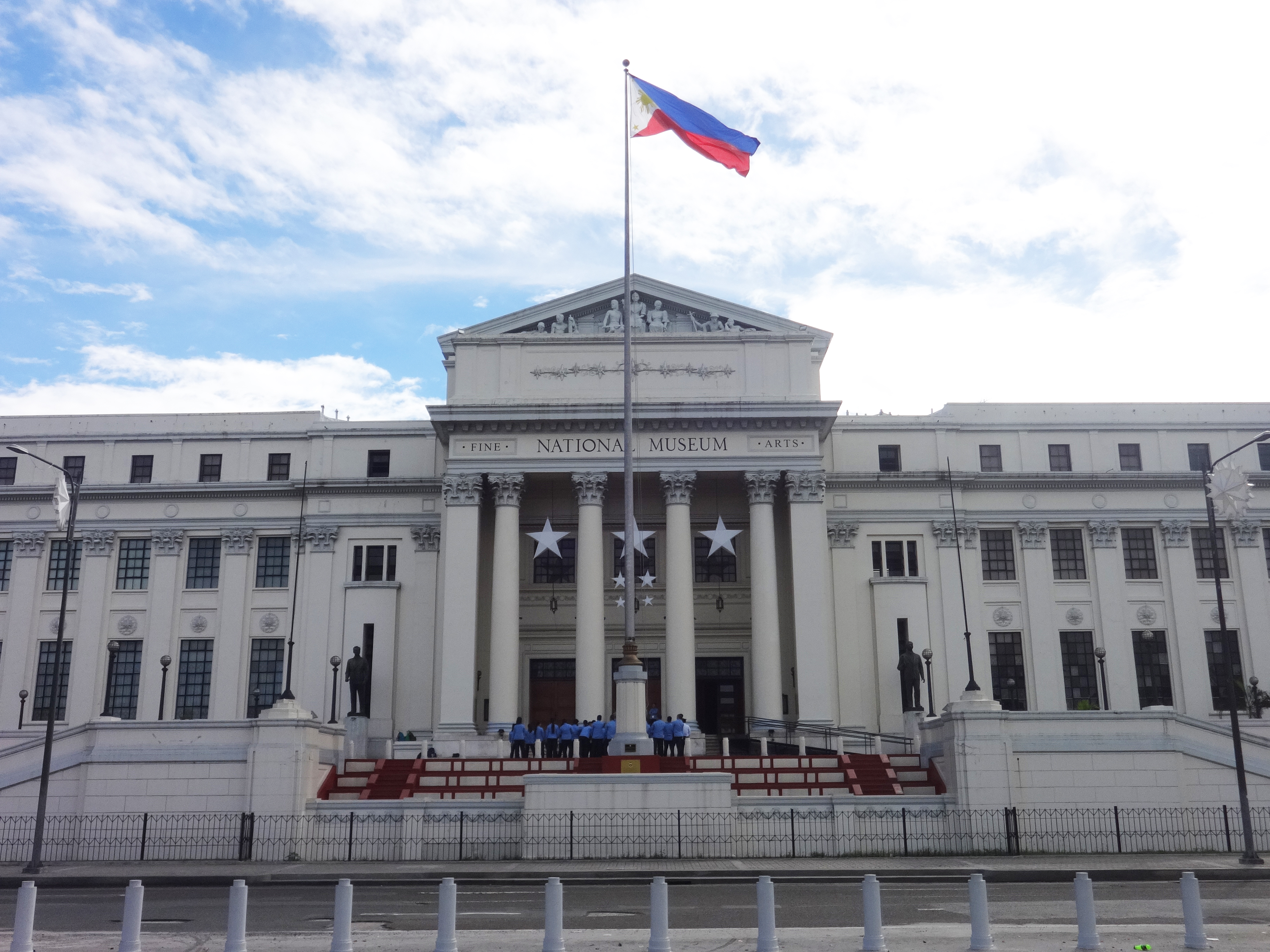
National Museum of Fine Arts

The National Museum Complex consists of the central museums of the National Museum of the Philippines in Metro Manila. These are the National Museum of Fine Arts, the National Museum of Anthropology, and the National Museum of Natural History. The National Planetarium is also part of this complex.

Museum	Opened
National Museum of Anthropology	1998
National Museum of Fine Arts	2000
National Museum of Natural History	2018

=== Satellite museums ===
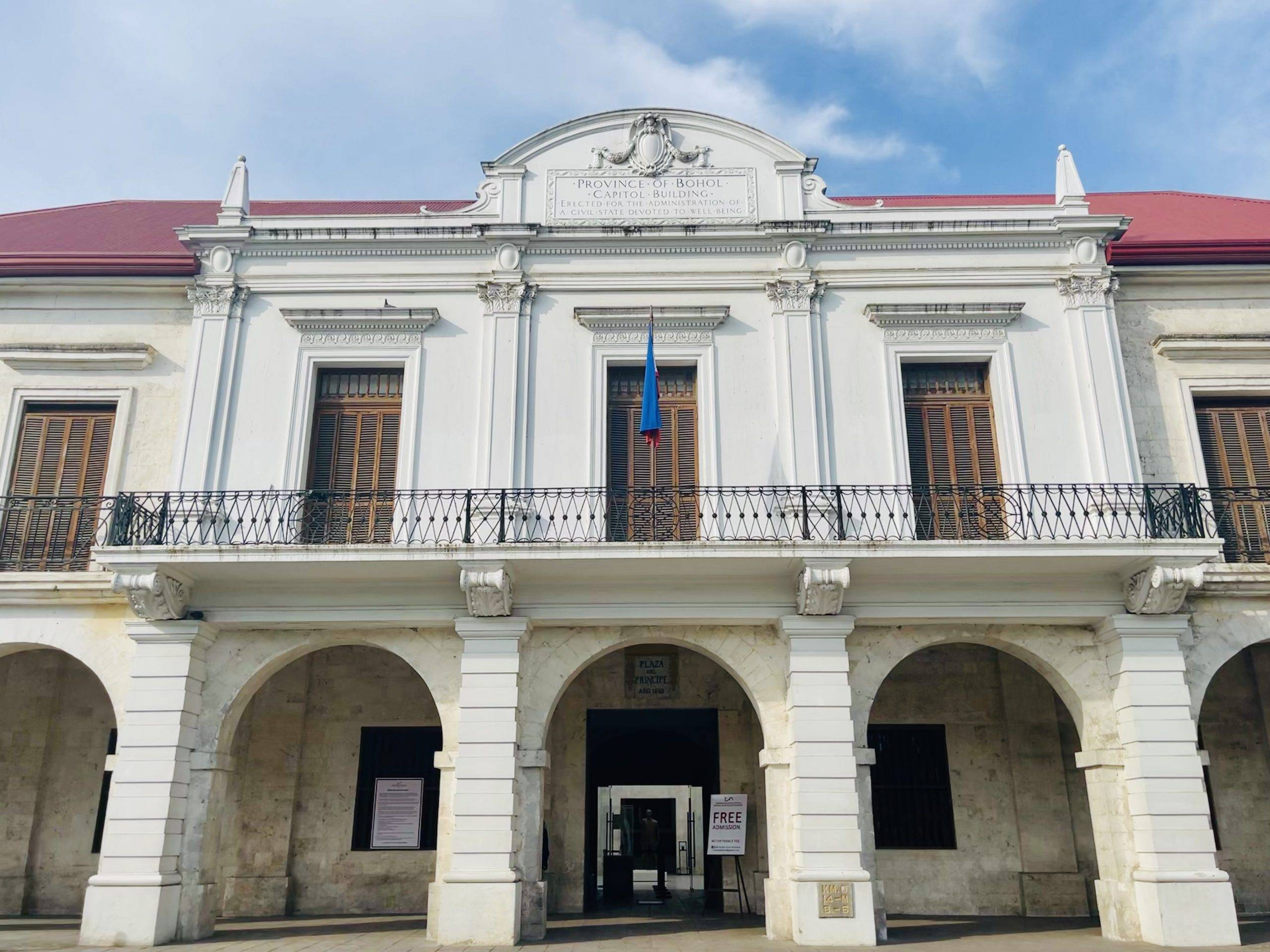
NMP Bohol, Tagbilaran

NM Caraga Regional Museum, Butuan

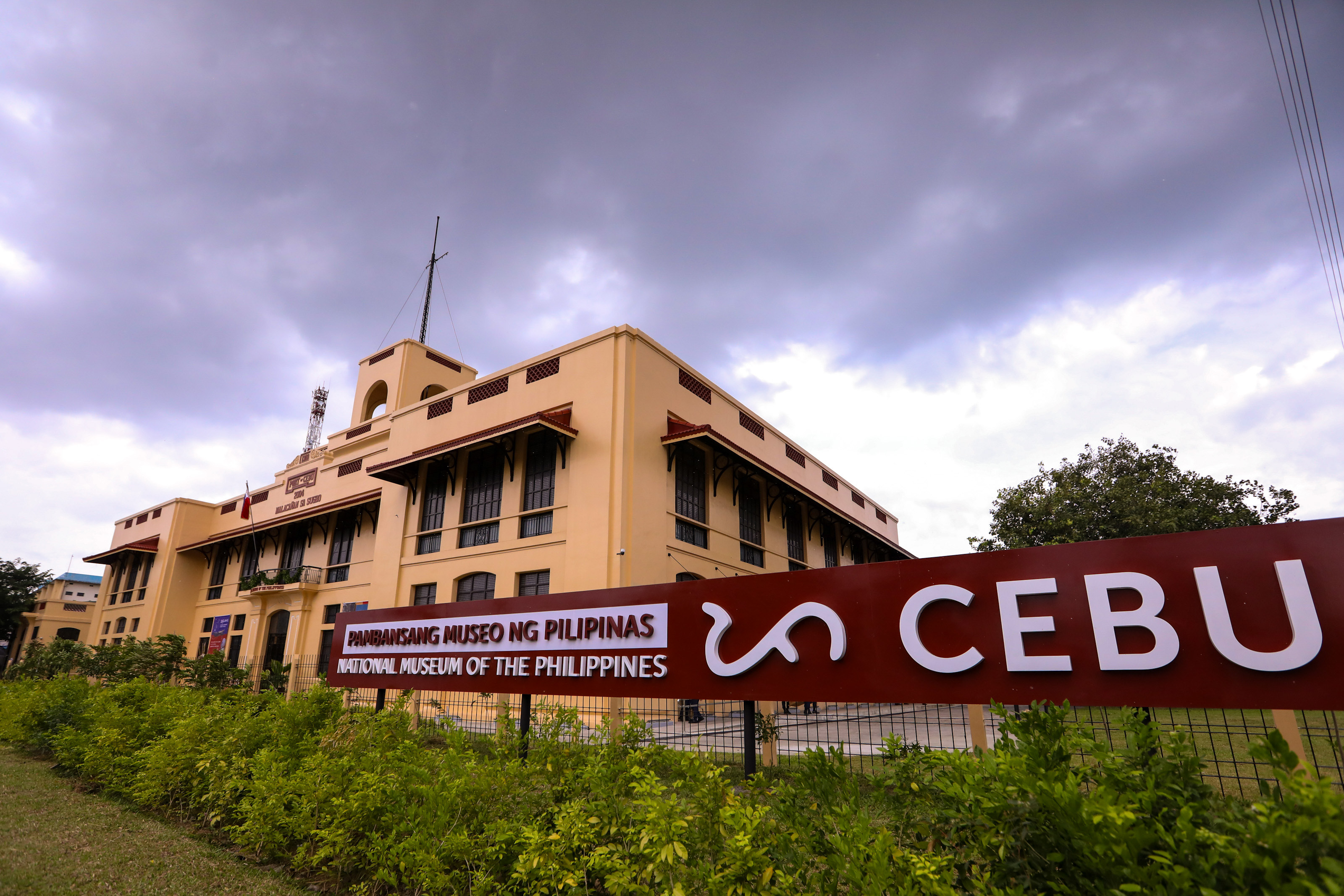
NM Central Visayas Regional Museum, Cebu City

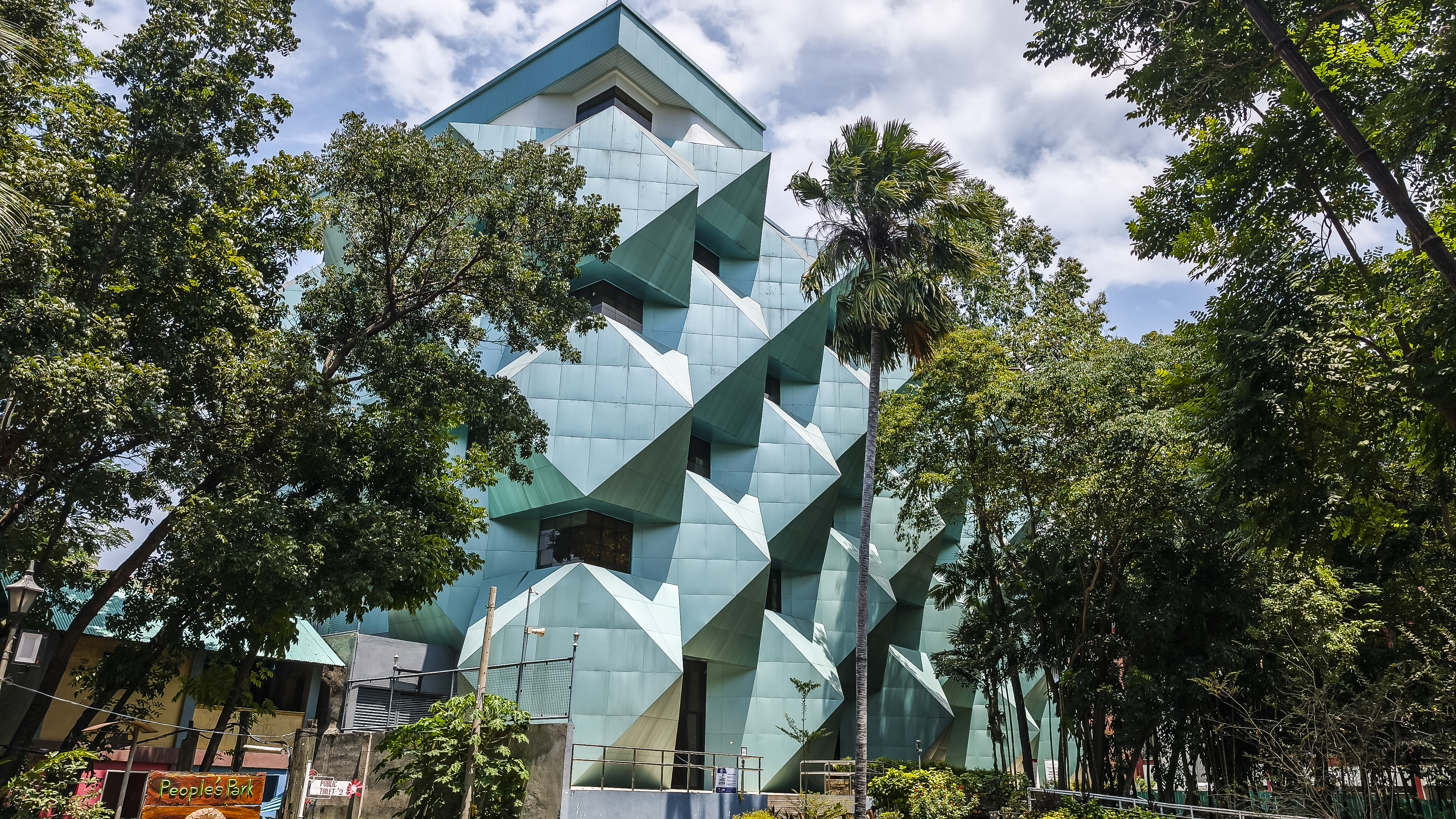
NM Davao Museum, Davao City

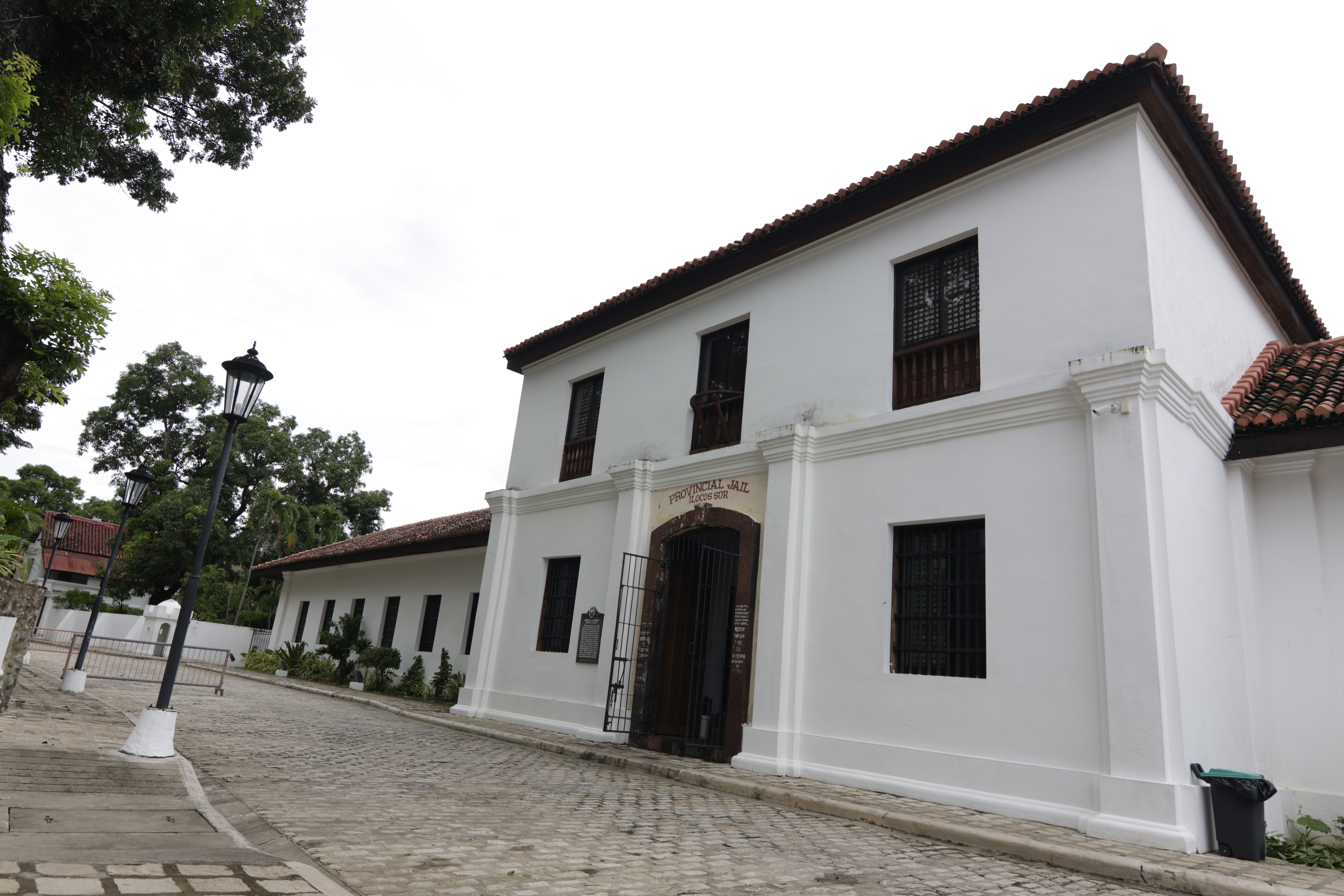
Old Carcel Museum, NM Ilocos Regional Museum Complex, Vigan

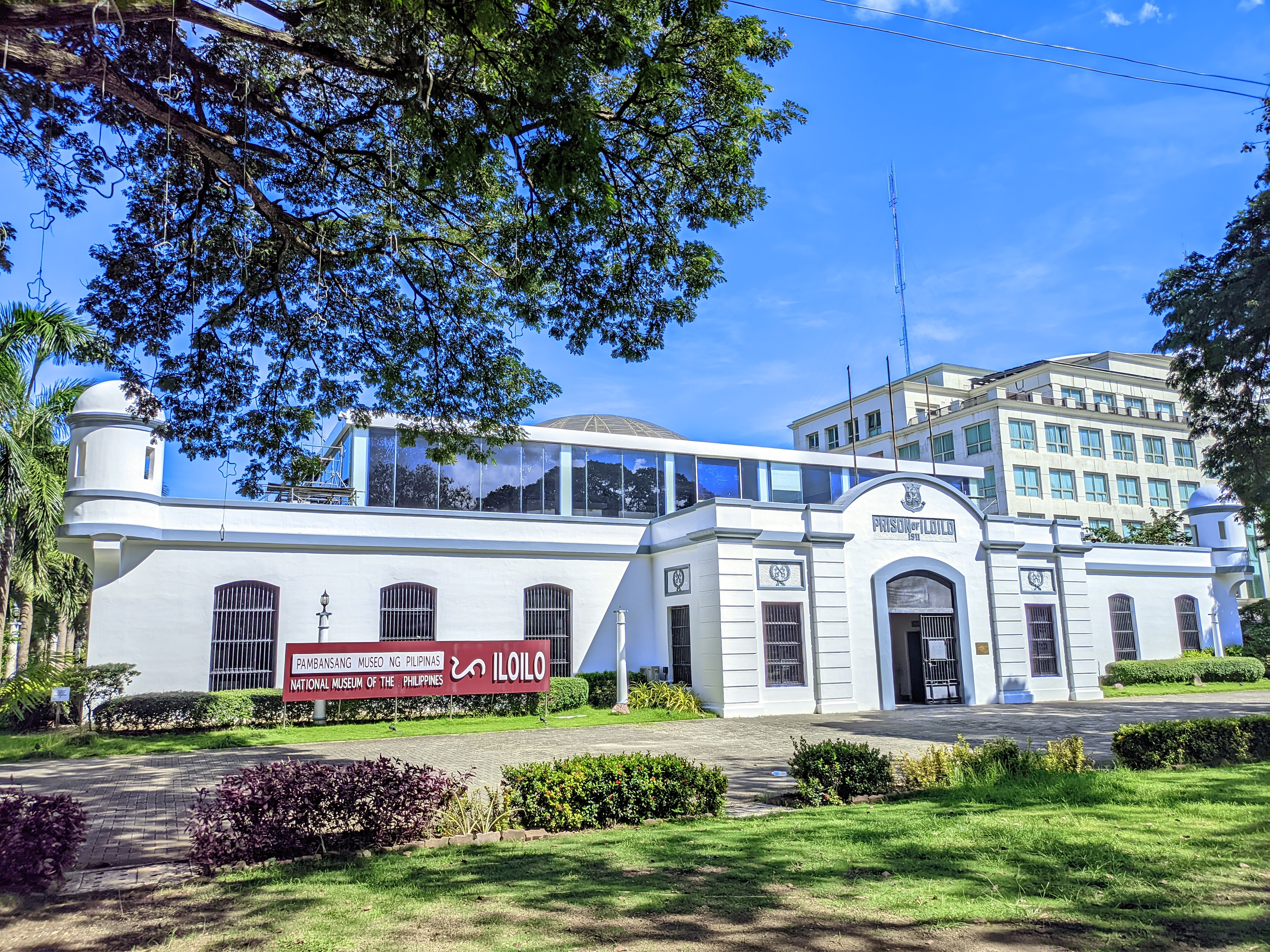
NM Western Visayas Museum, Iloilo City

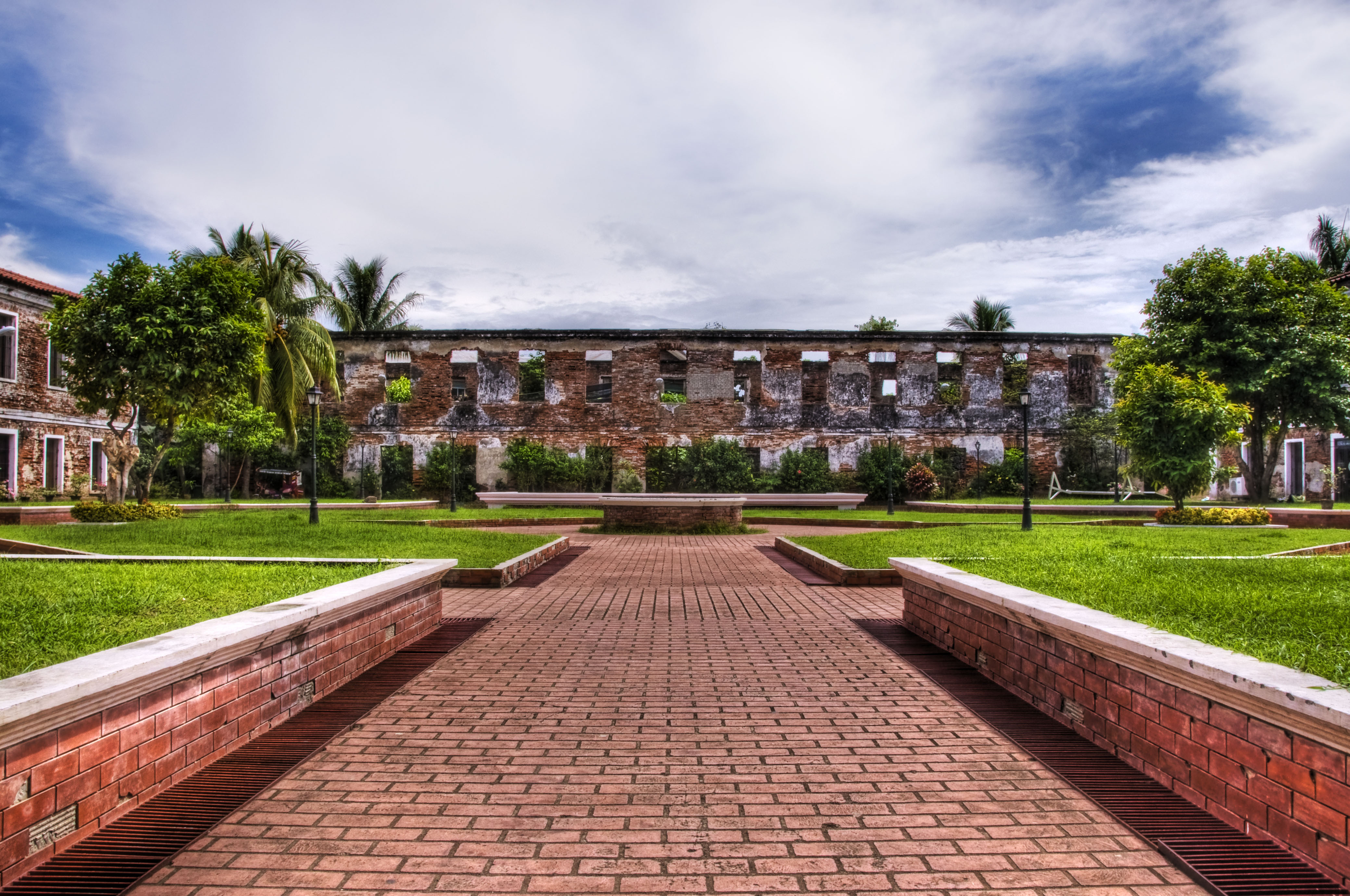
NM Zamboanga Regional Museum, Zamboanga City

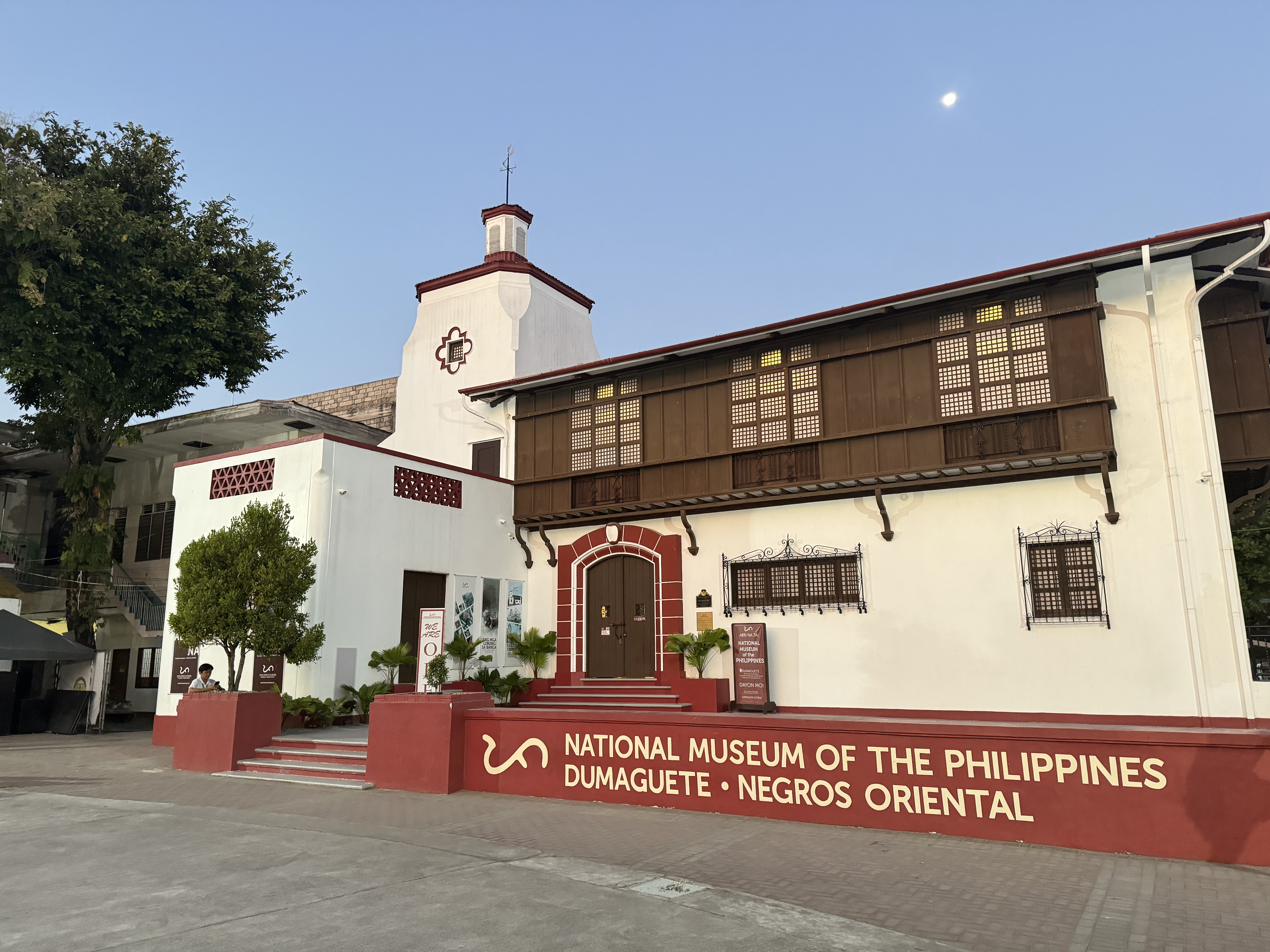
NMP Dumaguete, Dumaguete

NMP Sulu, Jolo

The National Museum has also established numerous satellite museums outside Metro Manila. Currently, there are no regional museums in 4 of 18 regions in the country, namely Central Luzon, Calabarzon, Eastern Visayas, and Northern Mindanao. Regional museums are mandated by law. Small area- or site museums exist in some of the country's regions.

Museum	Location	Opened	Region	Type
NMP – Baler	Baler, Aurora	2026	Central Luzon	Area
NMP – Batanes	Uyugan, Batanes	2012	Cagayan Valley	Area
NMP – Bicol	Daraga, Albay	1992	Bicol Region	Regional
NMP – Bohol	Tagbilaran City, Bohol	2018	Central Visayas	Area
NMP – Butuan	Butuan City	1978	Caraga	Regional
NMP – Cagayan	Peñablanca, Cagayan	1980	Cagayan Valley	Regional
NMP – Cebu	Cebu City	2023	Central Visayas	Regional
NMP – Cordillera	Kiangan, Ifugao	1984	Cordillera	Site
NMP – Davao	Davao City	2024	Davao Region	Regional
NMP – Ilocos Norte	Paoay, Ilocos Norte	2027	Ilocos Region	Area
NMP – Ilocos Sur	Vigan City and Magsingal, Ilocos Sur	2015	Ilocos Region	Regional
NMP – Iloilo	Iloilo City	2019	Western Visayas	Regional
NMP – Kabayan	Kabayan, Benguet	1982	Cordillera	Site
NMP – Koronadal	Koronadal City, South Cotabato	2027	SOCCSKSARGEN	Regional
NMP – Lake Sebu	Lake Sebu, South Cotabato	2027	SOCCSKSARGEN	Site
NMP – Marinduque	Boac, Marinduque	1995	MIMAROPA	Area
NMP – Negros Occidental	Talisay City, Negros Occidental	2027	Negros Island Region	Regional
NMP – Negros Oriental	Dumaguete City, Negros Oriental	2022	Negros Island Region	Area
NMP – Rizal	Angono and Binangonan, Rizal	1973	CALABARZON	Site
NMP – Sulu	Jolo, Sulu	1982	Bangsamoro	Area
NMP – Tabon Caves Complex	Quezon, Palawan	1972	MIMAROPA	Site
NMP – Zamboanga	Zamboanga City	1986	Zamboanga Peninsula	Regional

== Former facilities ==
=== Museums ===
The National Museum had a satellite museum in Bolinao, Pangasinan, an archeological museum featuring historic objects retrieved from the different parts of the province, first opened in 1970.

=== National Planetarium ===
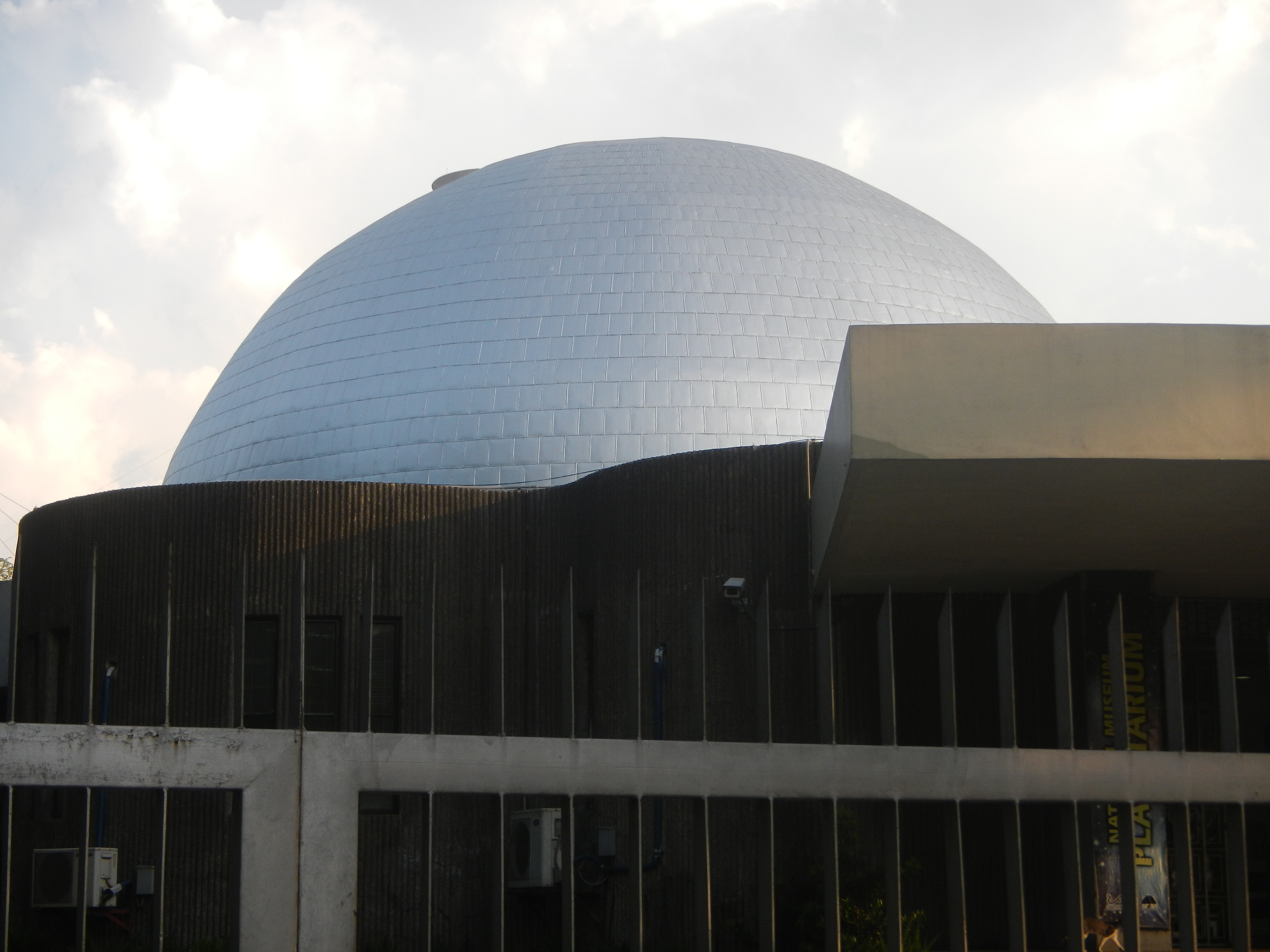
National Planetarium

A national planetarium was first planned in the 1970s by former National Museum director Godofredo Alcasid Sr., with the assistance of Maximo P. Sacro Jr. of the Philippine Weather bureau and one of the founders of the Philippine Astronomical Society.

Construction began in 1974 and was completed nine months later. It was formally inaugurated on October 8, 1975. Presidential Decree No. 804-A, issued on September 30, 1975, affirmed the planetarium's status. The site is between the Japanese Garden and the Chinese Garden at Rizal Park. The planetarium was decommissioned and closed in 2021 due to development works by the National Parks Development Committee.

== Future facilities ==
In 2024, the National Museum assumed possession of the ancestral house of Aniceto Lacson, the first and only president of the Negros Republic, located in Talisay, Negros Occidental, after it was donated by Lacson's heirs. P20 million was allotted to restore the house as part of plans to convert it into a museum.

In November 2025, the museum entered into an agreement with the provincial government of Ilocos Norte to open a branch in Paoay.

== Restitution claims ==
In 2023, the Smithsonian Institution in Washington, D.C., agreed to return the remains of 64 Filipinos that it acquired without consent during the American occupation for anthropological research, including to support racist beliefs about white supremacy, to the National Museum, following discussions with the latter and the Philippine Embassy.

In February 2024, the museum received a donation of four early 19th-century carved panels depicting various saints from the pulpit of Boljoon Church in Cebu from Union Bank of the Philippines CEO Edwin Bautista. The news of the donation led to demands from the Archdiocese of Cebu as well as officials and residents of the province for the panels to be returned, citing the fact that they were missing from the church since the 1980s due to either theft or illegal sale by the parish priest. In response, the museum said that it was open to sharing the panels with Cebu, adding that the donors procured the panels through legitimate means, "highlighting their commitment to ethical acquisition". A copy of the deed of donation of the panels obtained by Rappler notes the panels should stay with the museum, which would hold them in perpetuity and put them on display, while acknowledging that they came from Boljoon Church.

On April 1, the Cebu Provincial Board passed a motion to file charges against the National Museum and others who took custody of the panels. On May 8, the museum's board of trustees ruled in favor of returning the panels to Boljoon Church, doing so on March 14, 2025.
