= Dumaguete Presidencia =

Historic building in Negros Oriental, Philippines

National Museum of the Philippines – Dumaguete
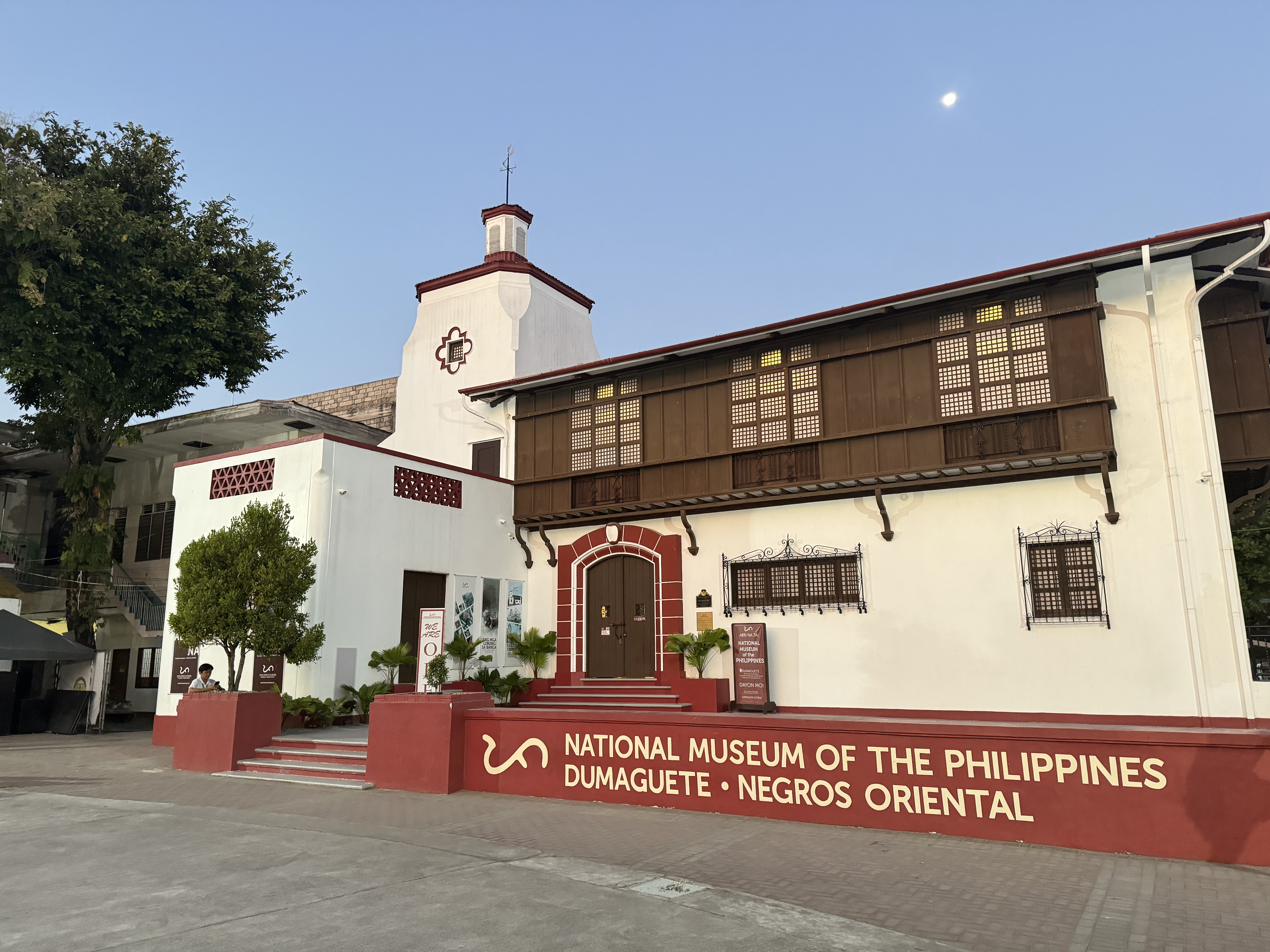
- Interactive map of the National Museum of the Philippines – Dumaguete area
- Alternative names: Dumaguete Presidencia

General information
- Location: Old Presidencia Building, City Hall Grounds, Sta. Catalina Street, Poblacion IV, Dumaguete, Philippines
- Coordinates: 9°18′19″N 123°18′34″E
- Current tenants: National Museum of the Philippines
- Completed: 1937
- Renovated: 2022

Design and construction
- Architect: Juan M. Arellano

The Dumaguete Presidencia is a historic building in Dumaguete, Philippines, built in 1937 with Juan M. Arellano as its architect. It is a mixture of indigenous Filipino, Spanish, and neoclassical architecture. It formerly served as the city hall of Dumaguete.

It was later renovated and converted into a museum as a branch of the National Museum of the Philippines (NMP), known as the National Museum of the Philippines – Dumaguete. The museum opened on November 25, 2022, in a ceremony during which a marker recognizing the building as an Important Cultural Property was also unveiled.
