= National Museum of the Philippines – Davao =

Regional museum in Davao, Philippines

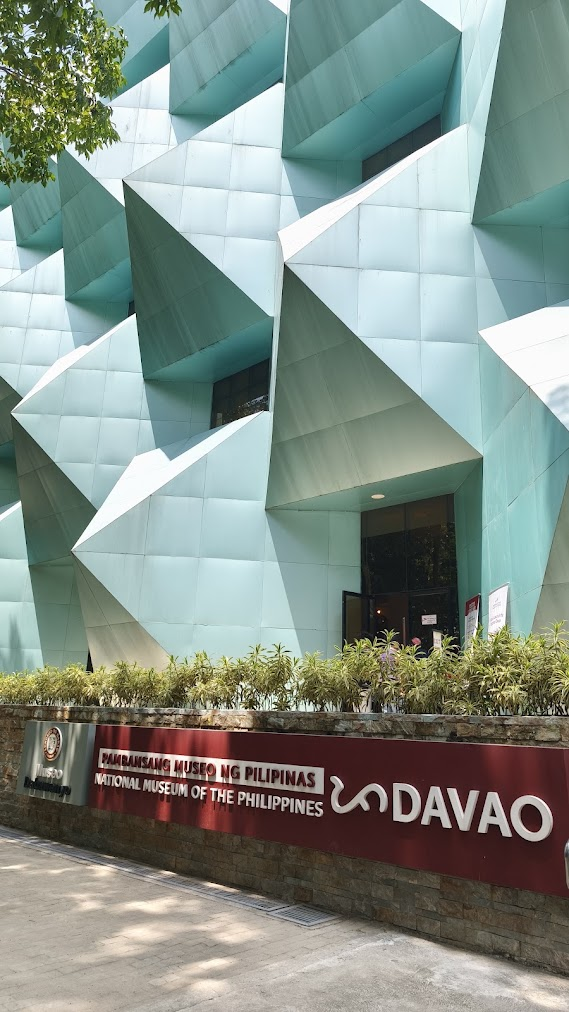
- The Davao Regional Museum in Davao City
- Established: December 1, 2024
- Location: People's Park Compound, J. Palma Gil St., Brgy. 4A, Poblacion District, Davao City
- Coordinates: 7°04′13″N 125°36′33″E
- Type: Regional Museum
- Architect: Clyde Eric Verga
- Owner: National Museum of the Philippines

The National Museum of the Philippines-Davao, also known as the NMP-Davao, is a museum in Davao City, Philippines. It is the 17th regional component museum of the National Museum of the Philippines and the 4th regional museum in Mindanao (after Butuan, Zamboanga, and Sulu).

== Design and construction ==
The building is a six-storey structure that adapts a mimetic architecture, taking inspiration from a Durian, one of Davao's identifiers. The construction started in 2021 in collaboration with the City Government of Davao and was to reported to have cost around ₱300 million Philippine pesos.

== Galleries and collections ==
The first four floors of the museum are managed by the National Museum of the Philippines while the fifth floor is managed by Museo Dabawenyo, the city's local museum.

The first floor houses the 40 ft (12 m) oil on canvas painting of "Davao Industries" by Victorio Edades, a national artist who spent his retirement years in Davao. An installation art entitled "Ahungan sa Panaghiusa" (The Hanging Gongs of Harmony) by Kubali Millan spans throughout the floors of the building. The agung, shaped pieces are made by over 50 Manobo weavers from Jose Abad Santos, Davao Occidental and are made of endemic materials such as rattan, nito, and abaca.

The second floor exhibits the region's biodiversity and geographic landscape such as rock specimens, insects and marine fossils. A replica of the Stegodon and taxidermied Philippine eagle can also be found here. The third floor is entitled "Bahandi: Ritual in Life Cycles" featuring artifacts and items used in everyday life by the indigenous tribes that settled in Mindanao. The fourth floor is entitled “Kabilin: Enduring Textile Tradition of Mindanao” showing the works of indigenous people groups and honours the Gawad ng Manlilikha ng Bayan. This section is in partnership with the National Commission for Culture and the Arts and Senator Loren Legarda. It also houses the works of renowned expressionist and national artist, Ang Kiukok.

== Gallery ==
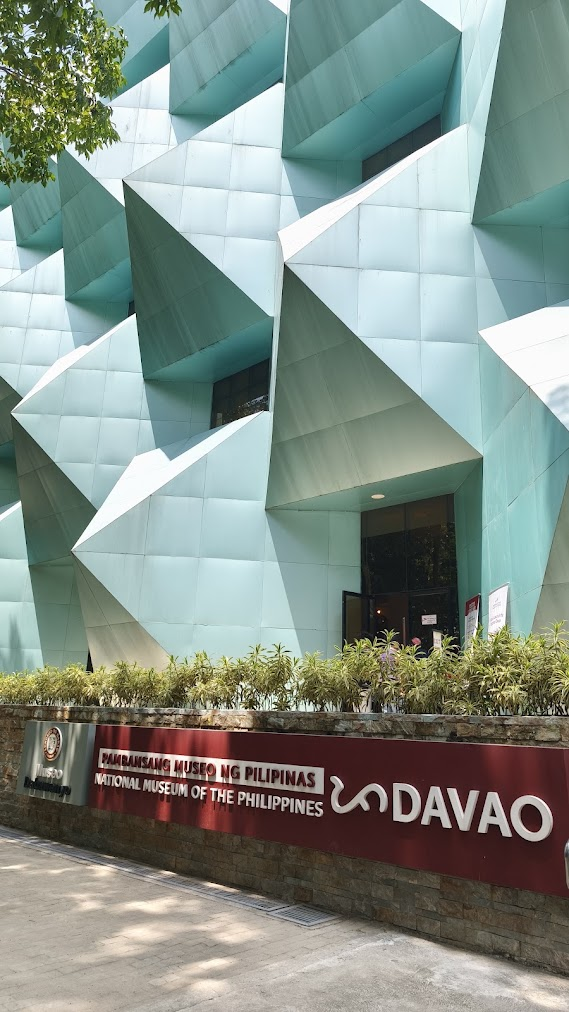

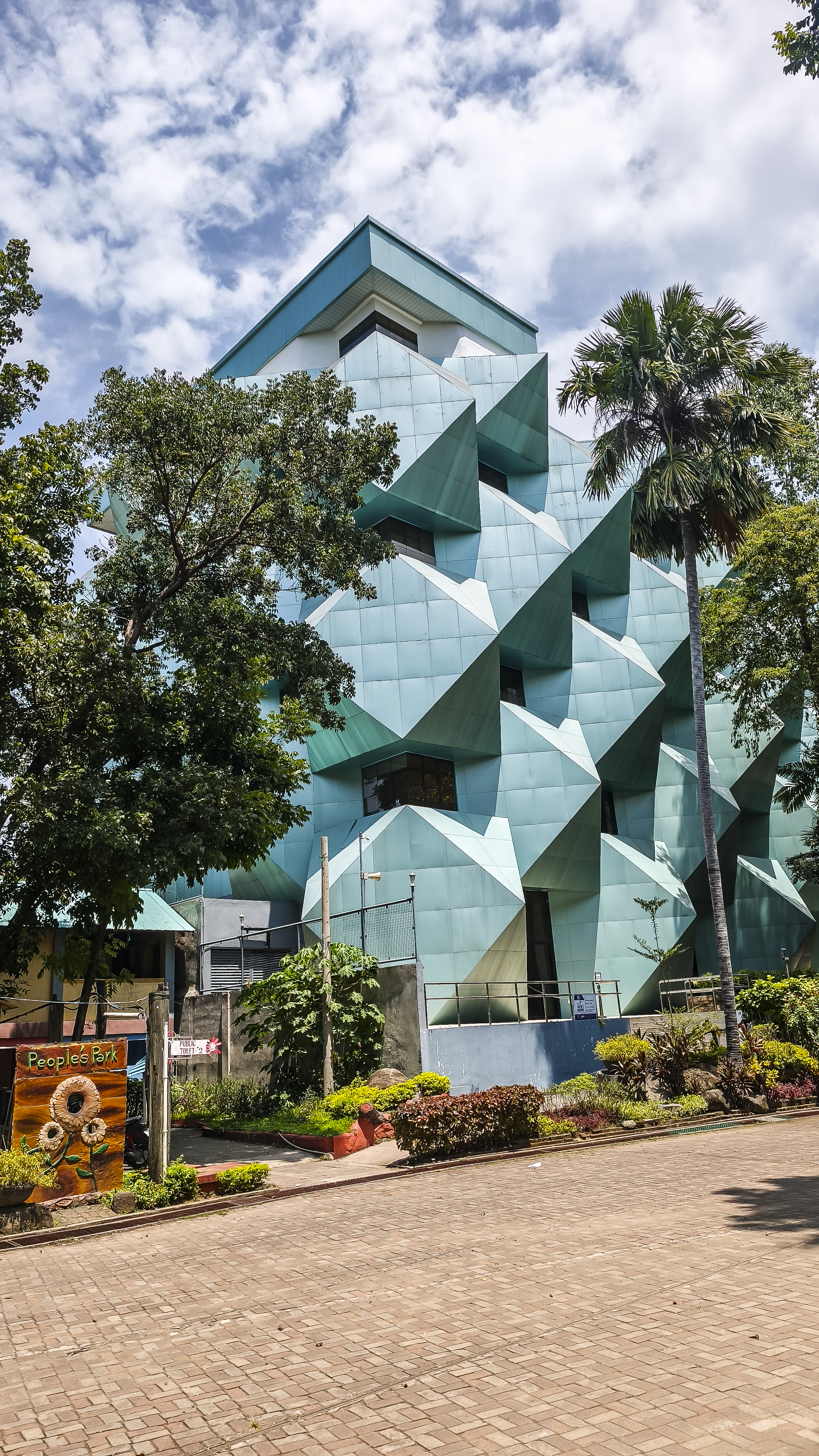

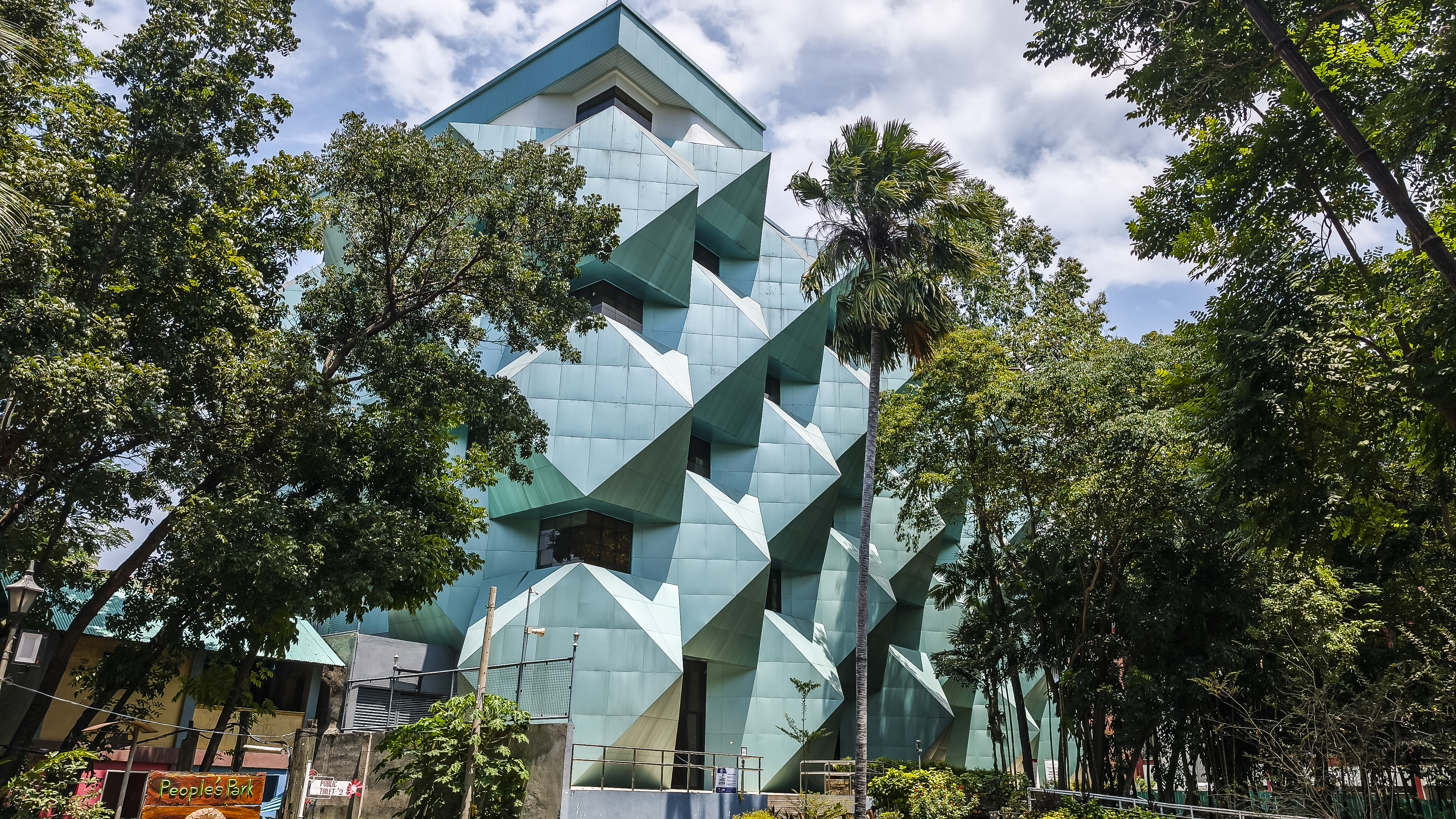

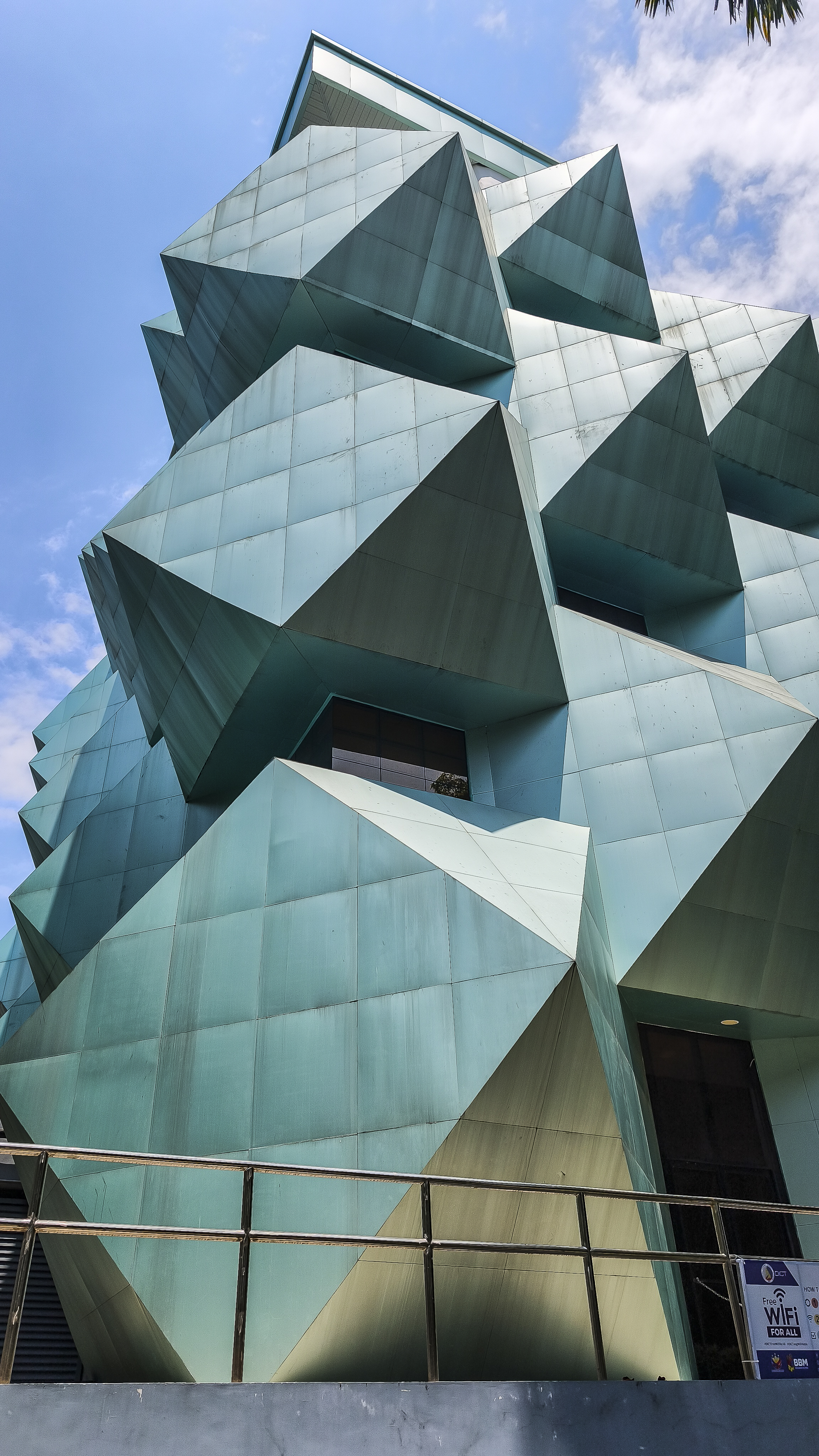

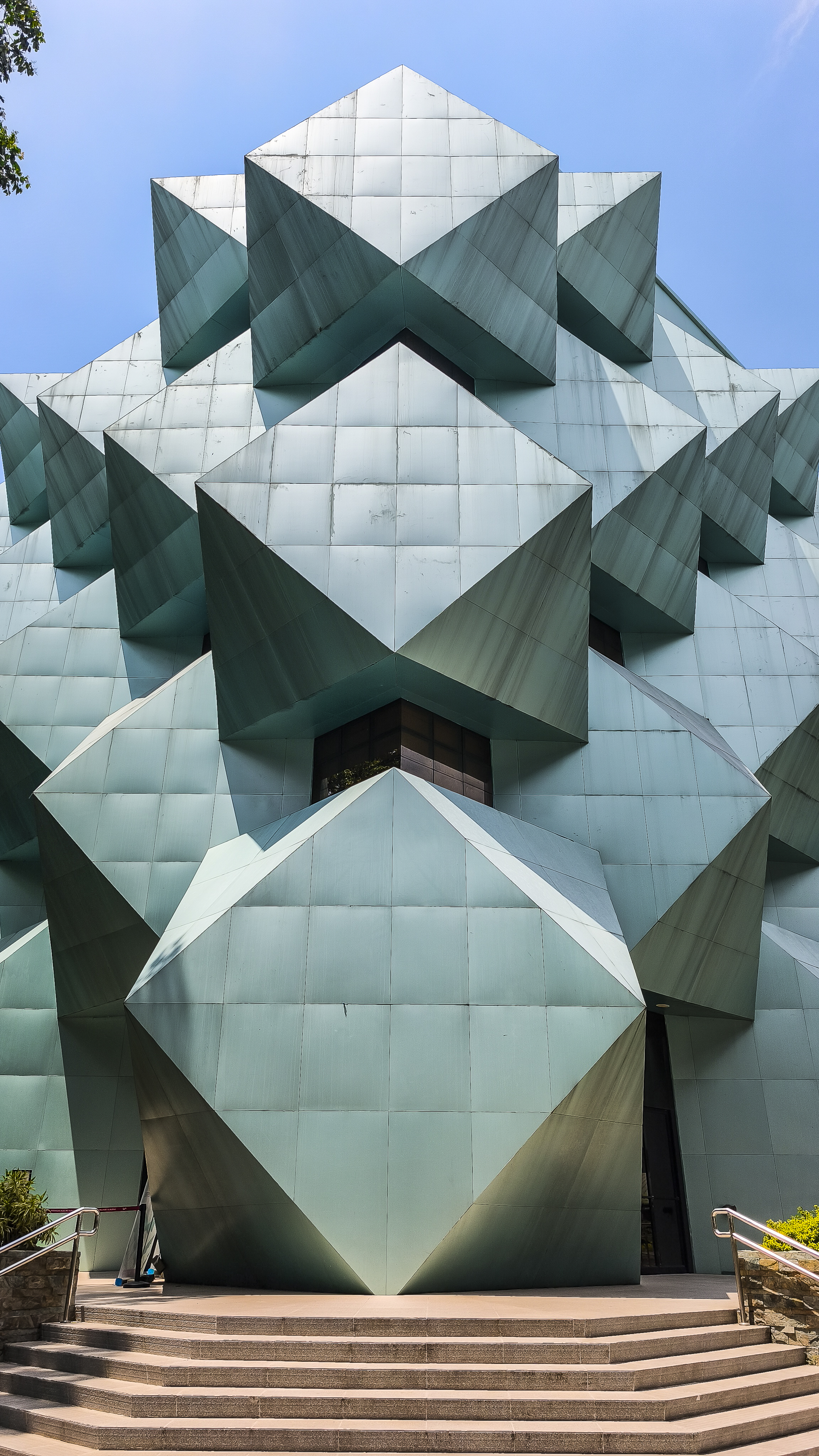
