= Ilocos Sur Provincial Library =

Public library in Ilocos Sur, Philippines

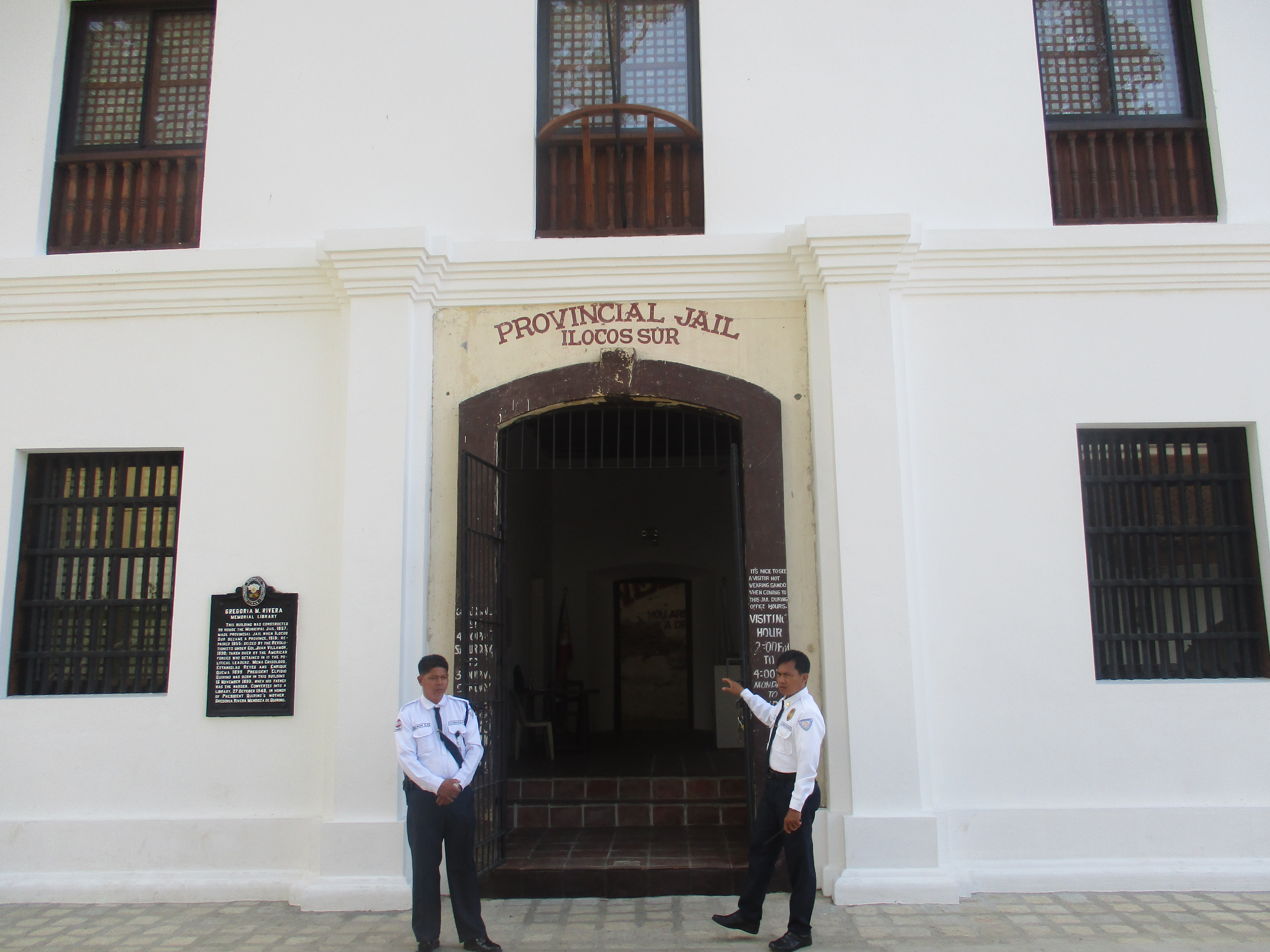
- The former location of the Gregoria M. Rivera Memorial Library (note the historical marker) and provincial jail (as stated in the signage), now a part of the National Museum - Ilocos Regional Museum Complex as the Old Carcel Museum
- 17°34′35″N 120°23′09″E
- Location: Vigan, Ilocos Sur, Philippines
- Type: Public library
- Established: 1948

Gregoria M. Rivera Memorial Library, commonly known as the Ilocos Sur Provincial Library, is a public library in Vigan, Ilocos Sur, Philippines.

== History ==
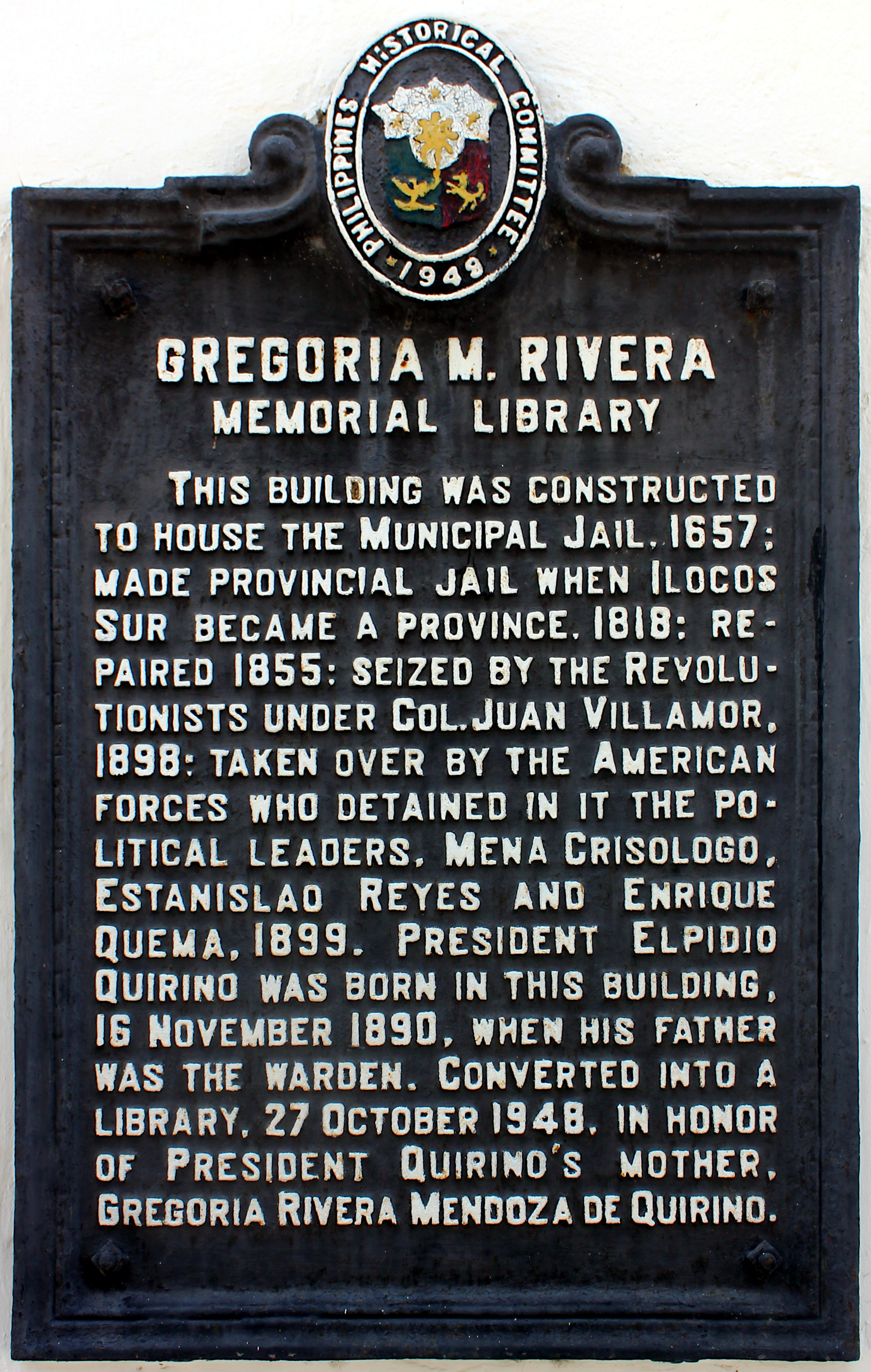
National historical marker installed in 1949

Before becoming a library, its building served as Vigan's jail in 1657, and became Ilocos Sur's provincial jail complex in 1855.

In 1890, Philippine president Elpidio Quirino was born inside the jail complex when his father served as jail warden. In 1948, a section of the jail complex was converted into a provincial library, and named after Quirino's mother, Gregoria Rivera. The building ceased functioning as a jail on June 30, 2014.

The Old Carcel building, together with the neighboring Padre Burgos Museum and the Magsingal Museum, currently form the NM Ilocos Regional Museum Complex (National Museum Ilocos).

== Recognition ==
The Philippines Historical Committee, a predecessor of the National Historical Commission of the Philippines, installed a historical marker in 1949.

== Gallery ==
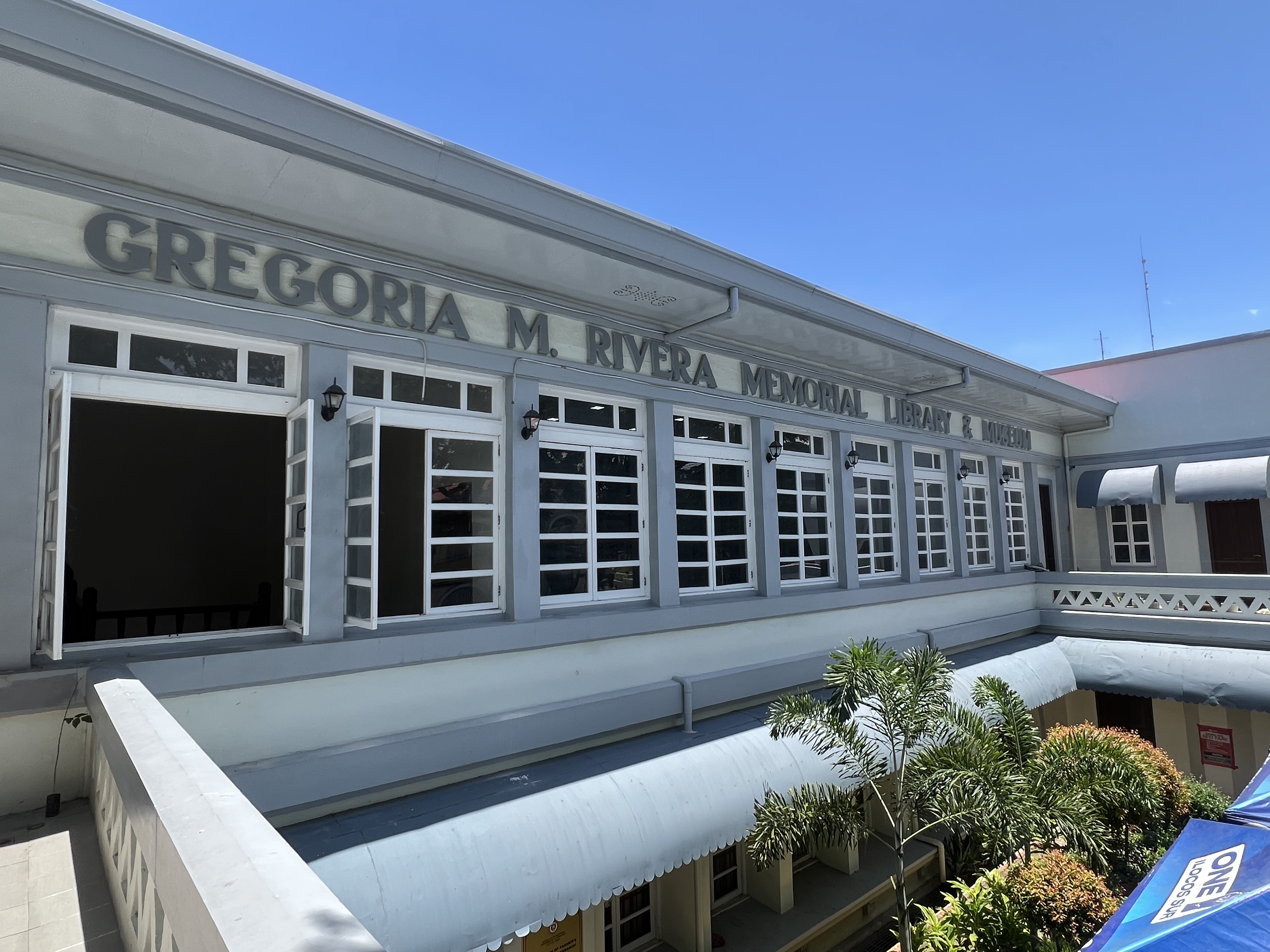
The Gregoria M. Rivera Memorial Library & Museum building. The Ilocos Sur Provincial Library is located on its second floor.

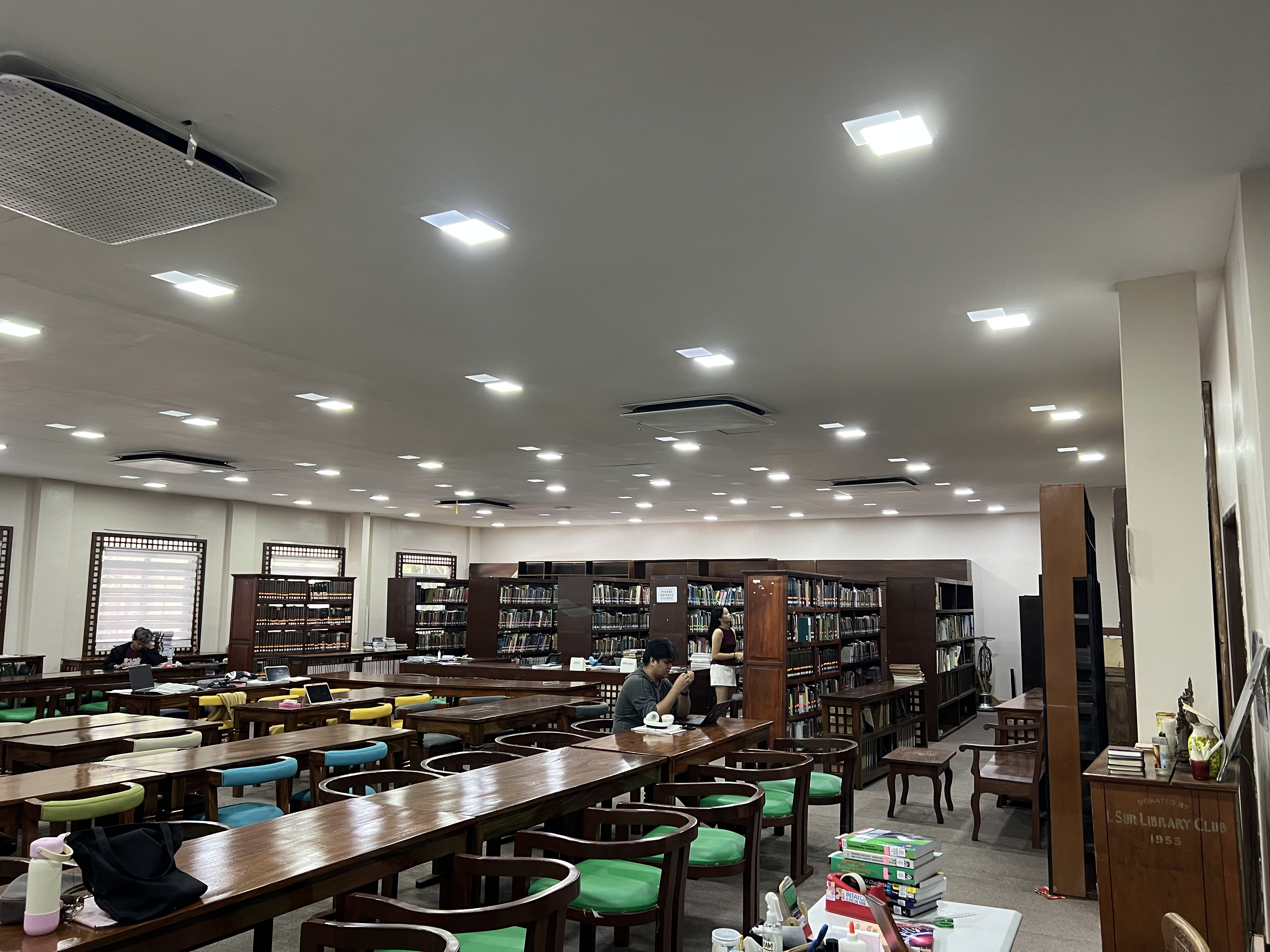
Library interior
