= National Museum of the Philippines – Bohol =

Coordinates: 9.6403°N 123.8566°E

- Pambansang Museo ng Pilipinas (Bohol)
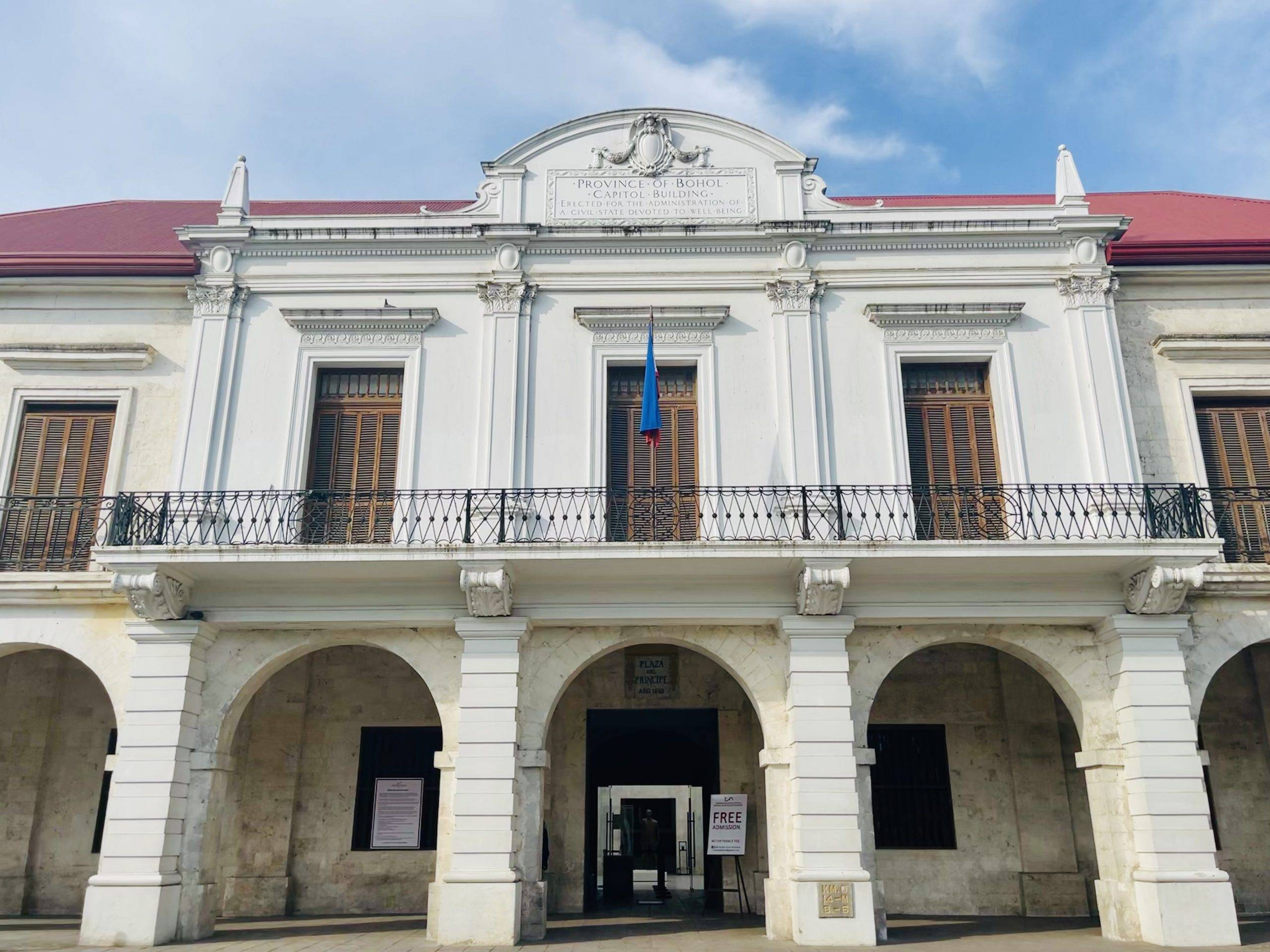
- Exterior of the former Provincial Capitol Building of Bohol, post-renovation and repurposing as the National Museum - Bohol building
- Location: Carlos P. Garcia Avenue, Old Bohol Capitol, Tagbilaran, Bohol, Philippines
- Type: Regional museum
- Owner: National Museum of the Philippines
- Website: www.nationalmuseum.gov.ph/national-museum-bohol/

National Museum of the Philippines – Bohol (also known as the Bohol Area Museum) is a regional museum under the National Museum of the Philippines. It is located in Tagbilaran, the capital of the province of Bohol, Philippines.

== History ==
The museum is housed in the former Provincial Capitol Building of Bohol, a structure originally constructed in the mid-19th century during the Spanish colonial era. The building was used as the seat of the provincial government until the 2013 Bohol earthquake caused extensive damage to it.

Following the earthquake, the building underwent major retrofitting and conservation work by the National Museum in partnership with the provincial government. It was then repurposed as the regional museum for Bohol. The museum officially reopened to the public on July 22, 2023, showcasing upgraded facilities and expanded exhibitions.

== Exhibits ==
The museum features both permanent and changing exhibitions highlighting the cultural and natural heritage of Bohol. Notable exhibits include:

- Prehistoric Bohol – featuring archaeological finds from local cave sites.
- Boholano Culture and Traditions – displaying textiles, musical instruments, and religious artifacts.
- Natural Heritage of Bohol – exhibits related to the province's unique biodiversity and geological features, such as the Chocolate Hills.
- Visual Arts Gallery – featuring works by Boholano artists, including Ray Francia.

== Gallery ==
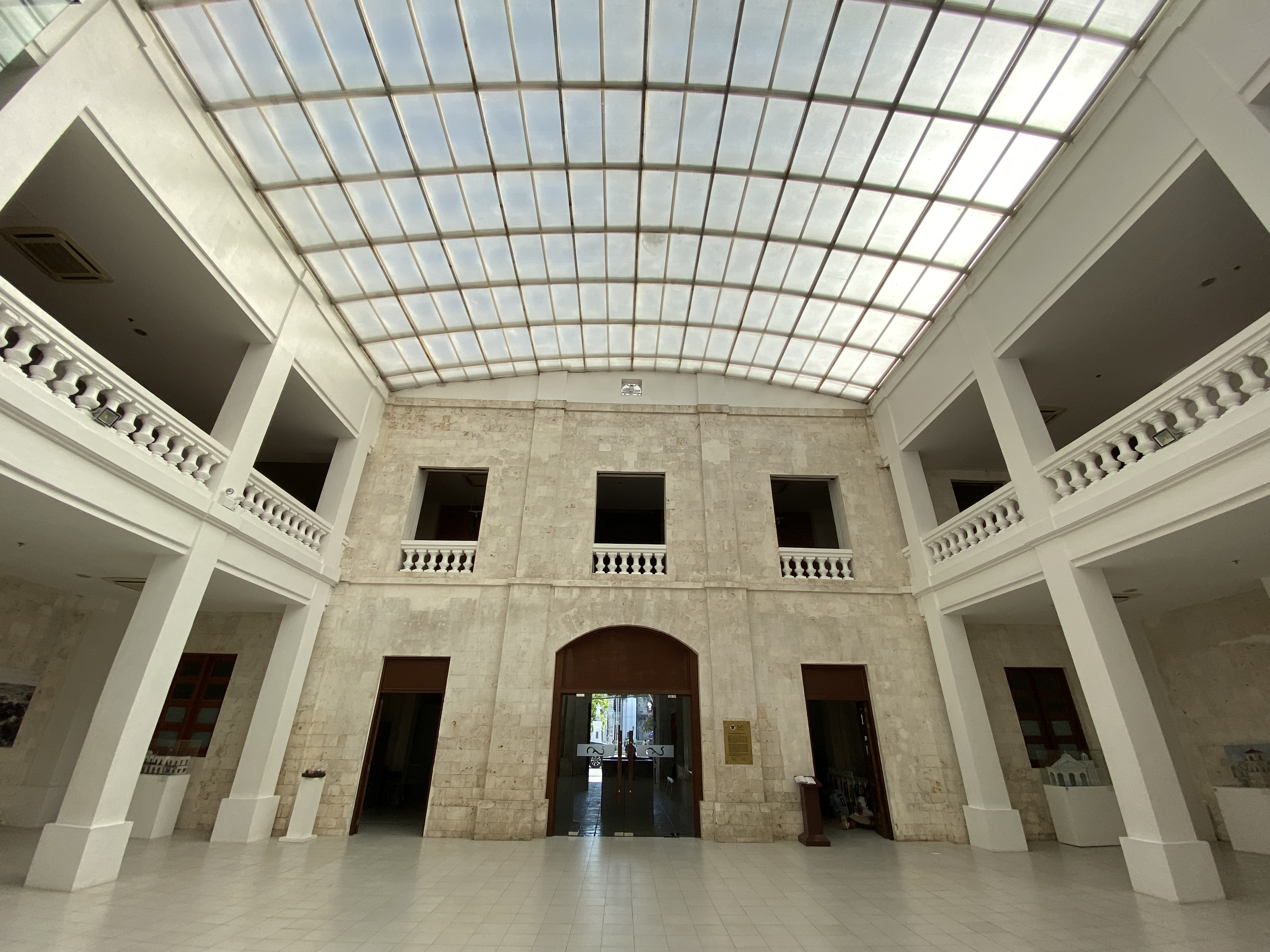
Central atrium

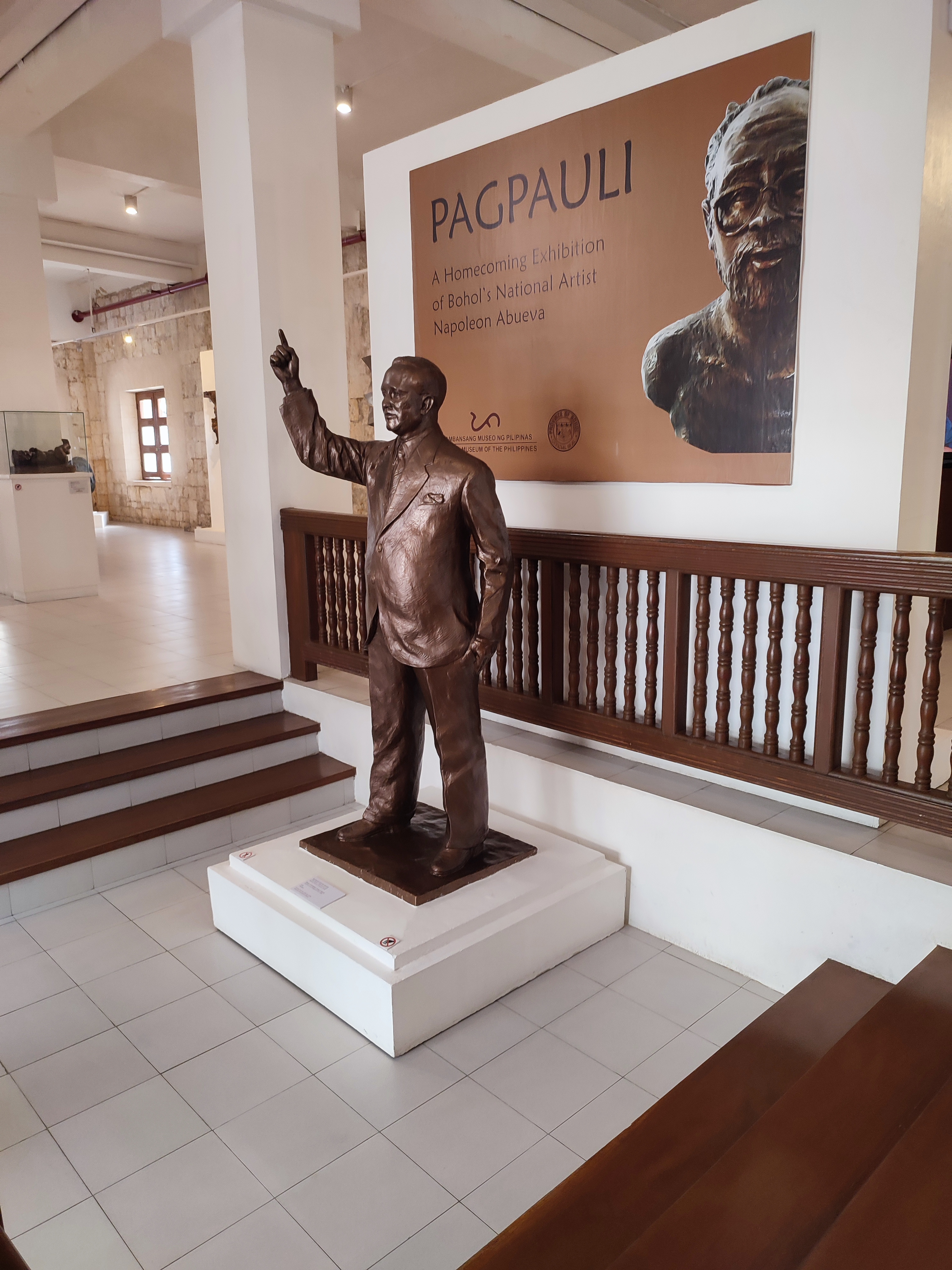
Pagpauli gallery honoring National Artist Napoleon Abueva

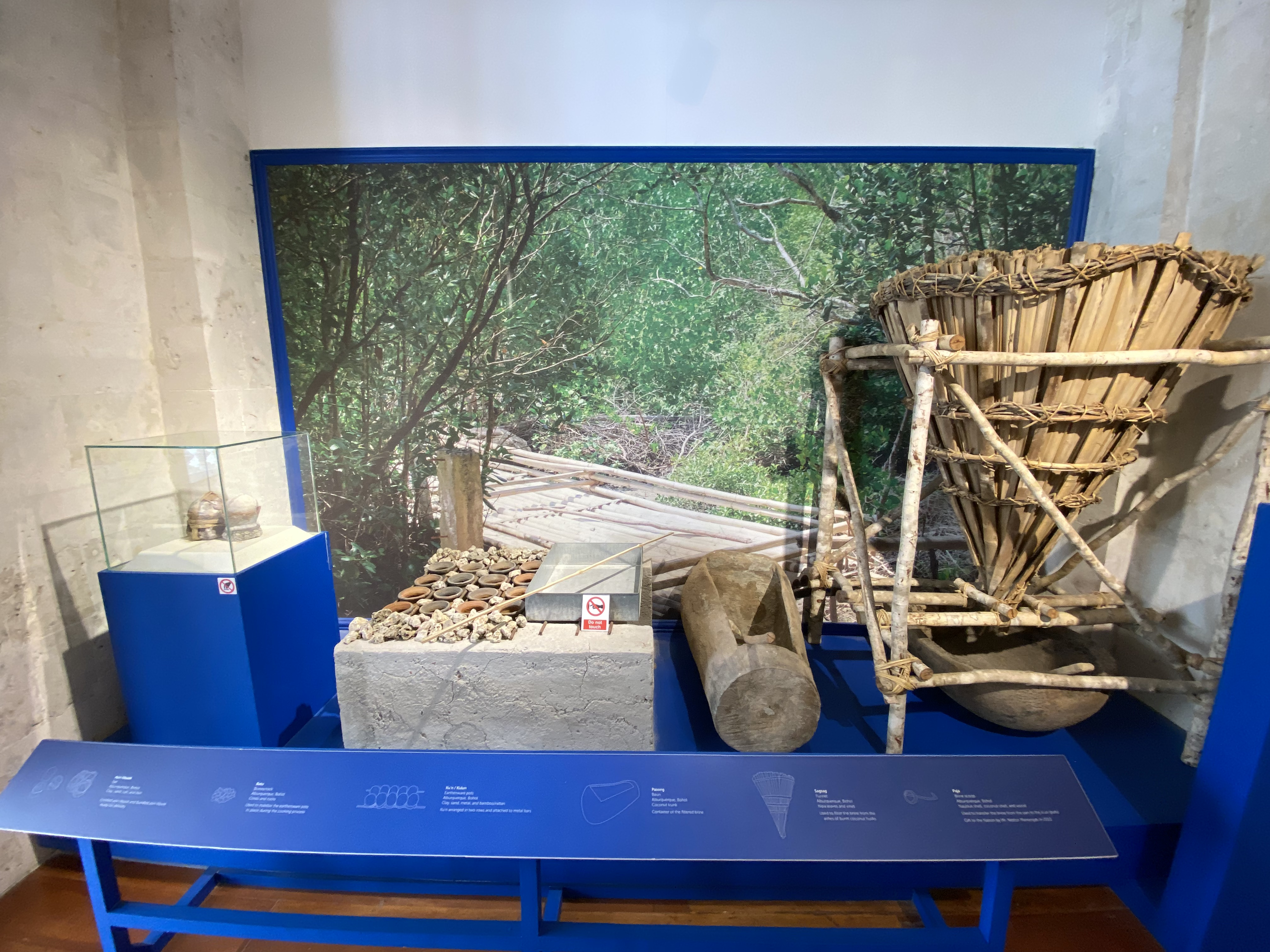
An exhibit on the production of asín tibuok

== See also ==
- National Museum of the Philippines
