= Padre Burgos House =

Historic house in Ilocos Sur, Philippines

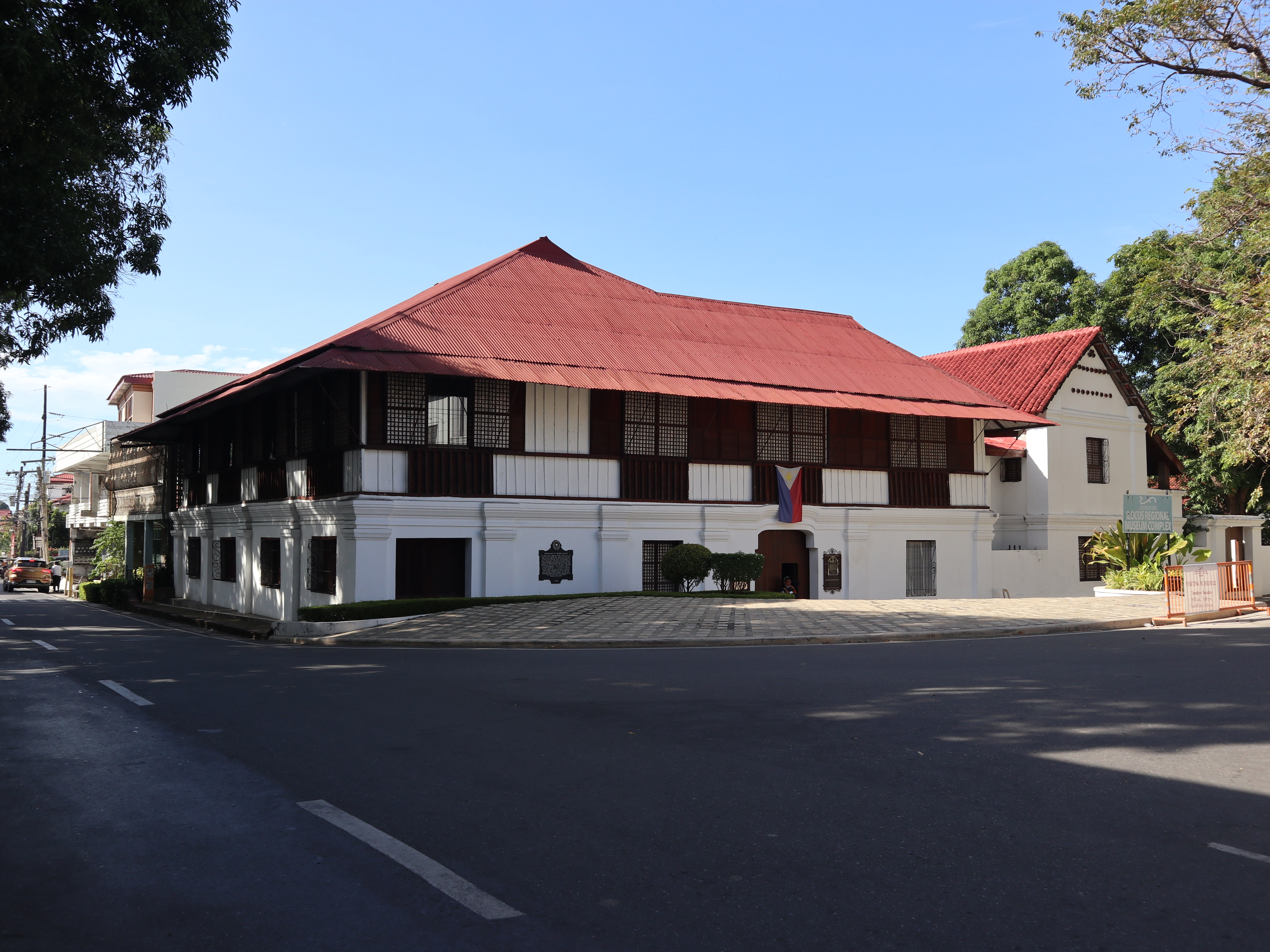

General information
- Location: Vigan, Ilocos Sur, Philippines
- Coordinates: 17°34′32″N 120°23′09″E
- Completed: 1788
- Padre Burgos Museum
- Former name: Ayala Museum–Vigan
- Established: 1975
- Founder: Filipinas Foundation
- Owners: Filipinas Foundation (1975–1987); Ilocos Historical and Cultural Foundation (1987–1989); National Museum of the Philippines (1989–present)

The Padre Burgos House, built in 1788, is a historic house in Vigan, Ilocos Sur, Philippines. It was the residence of the Filipino Catholic priest Jose Burgos (1837–1872), a leader of the secularization movement, referring to the full incorporation of Filipino priests into the Catholic hierarchy in the Philippines, which was dominated by Spanish friars in the past. Alongside two other Filipino priests, Mariano Gomez and Jacinto Zamora, Burgos was arrested on false charges of sedition and incitement of the Cavite mutiny and executed in 1872.

== Architecture ==
The Padre Burgos House is an example of an early bahay-na-bato house architecture that is built smaller and closer to the ground, than the later versions found in Vigan and elsewhere.

Typical of the bahay-na-bato, the wood-framed upper level was where the family lived; it would be reached through a grand wooden staircase rising from the zaguan, a carriageway running from a huge wooden entrance door on the ground floor. The rest of the stone-walled ground floor was used for storage.

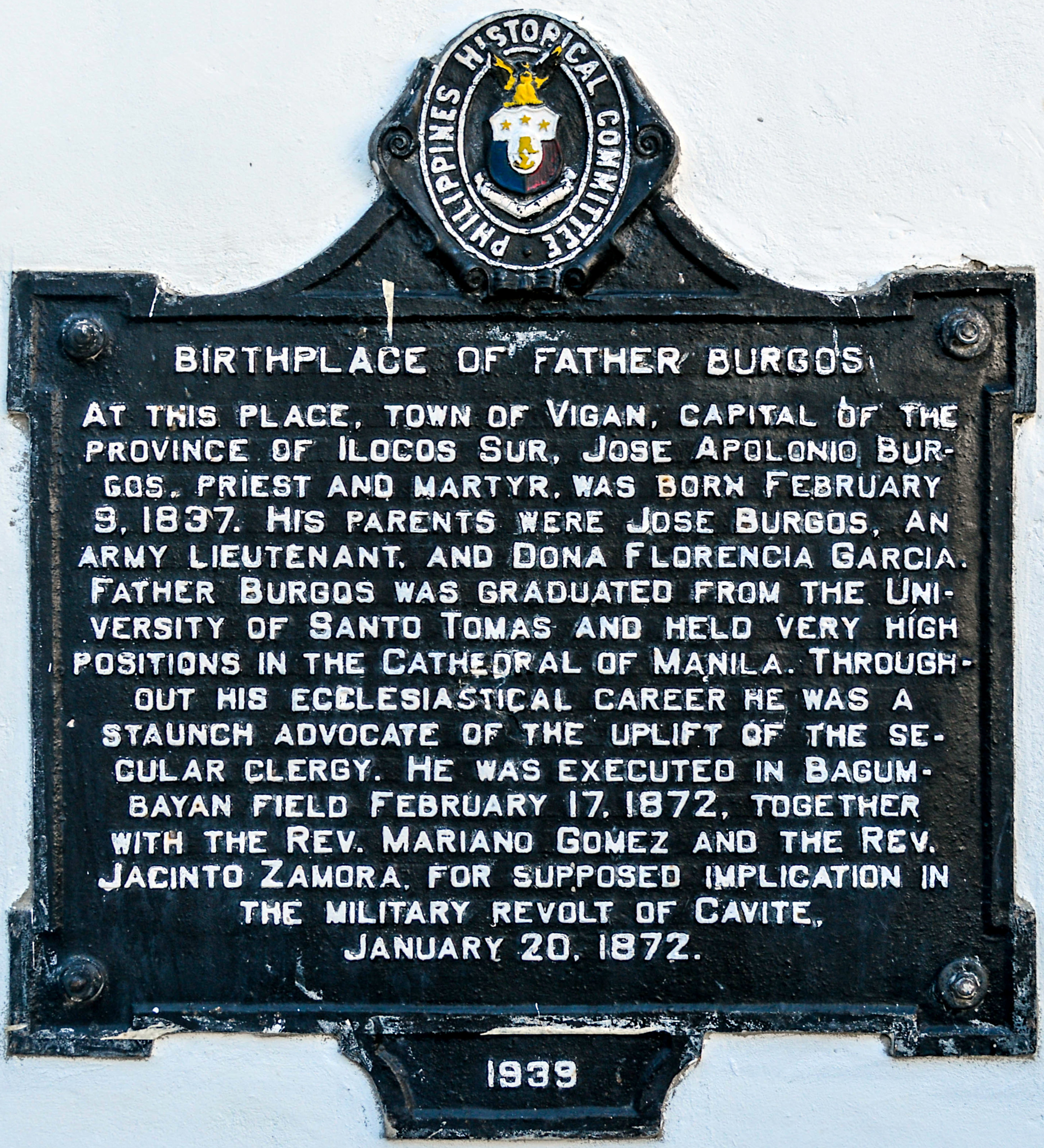
National Historical Commission of the Philippines historical marker

== Museum ==
Burgos' house serves as a museum and currently is one of three buildings that are part of the NM Ilocos Regional Museum Complex (National Museum Ilocos), along with the neighboring Old Carcel building (former provincial jail) and the Magsingal Museum. It has one of the original copies of Jose Rizal's novel Noli Me Tangere. The house also displays 19th-century paintings by the Ilocano painter Esteban Villanueva of the 1807 Basi Revolt.

The Padre Burgos Museum was established in 1975 as the Ayala Museum–Vigan by the Filipinas Foundation of the Ayala Corporation. In 1987, the museum and its collection was donated to the Ilocos Historical and Cultural Foundation (IHCF) and two years later was turned over to the National Museum of the Philippines. The National Museum Ilocos network was inaugurated in 2015.

== Heritage status ==
The National Historical Commission of the Philippines installed a historical marker on the house's façade in 1939.
