= National Living Treasures Award =

Philippine order

National Living Treasure Award Gawad sa Manlilikha ng Bayan (Filipino)
- Awards logo

Awarded by Philippines
- Type: Medal
- Awarded for: See Award
- Status: Currently constituted
- Sovereign: President of the Philippines

Statistics
- First induction: 1993; 33 years ago

Precedence
- Next (higher): Order of Gabriela Silang
- Next (lower): Gawad Mabini
- Equivalent: Order of National Artists, Order of National Scientists, Order of National Social Scientists, Order of Lakandula - Special Class of Champion for Life
- Ribbon bar of the order

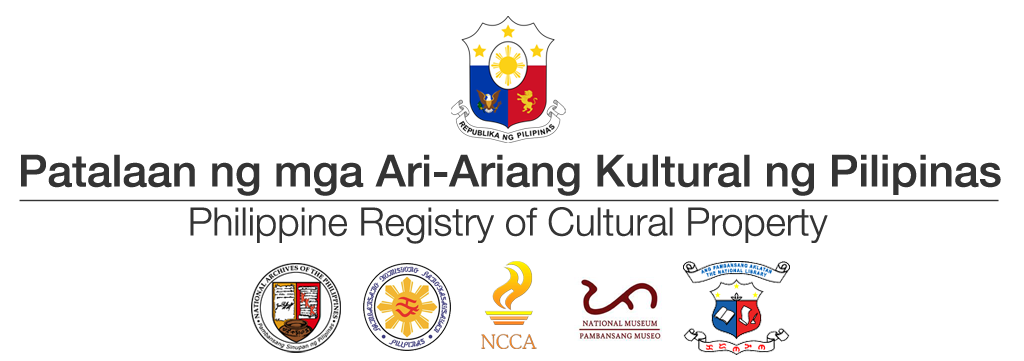
Current logo for the Philippine Registry of Cultural Property

The National Living Treasures Award, alternatively known as the Gawad sa Manlilikha ng Bayan (GAMABA), is conferred to a person or group of artists recognized by the Government of the Philippines for their contributions to the country's intangible cultural heritage. A recipient of the award, a National Living Treasure or Manlilikha ng Bayan is "a Filipino citizen or group of Filipino citizens engaged in any traditional art uniquely Filipino, whose distinctive skills have reached such a high level of technical and artistic excellence and have been passed on to and widely practiced by the present generations in their community with the same degree of technical and artistic competence."

== History ==
In 1988, the National Folk Artists Award was organized by the Rotary Club of Makati-Ayala. The distinctions were given by the organization until it was replaced by the GAMABA Law in 1992. The recipients of the National Folk Artists from 1988 to 1992 were not declared as GAMABA even after the GAMABA Law was enacted, creating a gap in the legal recognition of traditional artists previously recognized as National Folk Artists. Of those recognized as National Folk Artists from 1988 to 1992, only Fidel Antiporda Go from Vigan City was given a marker, where it read that the award was given to him by the National Commission of the Philippines (NCCA) in 1990. The other pre-GAMABA Law National Folk Artists are publicly unknown, since a list of the recipients is virtually missing in online public records.

The National Living Treasures Award (Gawad sa Manlilikha ng Bayan) was institutionalized in 1992 through Republic Act No. 7355. The National Commission for Culture and the Arts, which is the highest policy-making and coordinating body of the Philippines for culture and the arts, was tasked with the implementation and awarding. This is in line with UNESCO's criteria of Living National Treasures.

== Criteria ==
To become a National Living Treasure, the candidate must possess the following qualifications:

1. is an inhabitant of an indigenous/traditional cultural community anywhere in the Philippines that has preserved indigenous customs, beliefs, rituals and traditions and/or has syncretized whatever external elements that have influenced it.
2. must have engaged in a folk art tradition that has been in existence and documented for at least 50 years.
3. must have consistently performed or produced over a significant period, works of superior and distinctive quality.
4. must possess a mastery of tools and materials needed by the art, and must have an established reputation in the art as master and maker of works of extraordinary technical quality.
5. must have passed on and/or will pass on to other members of the community their skills in the folk art for which the community is traditionally known.

A traditional artist who possesses all the qualities of a Manlilikha ng Bayan candidate, but due to age or infirmity has left them incapable of teaching further their craft, may still be recognized if:

1. had created a significant body of works and/or has consistently displayed excellence in the practice of their art, thus achieving important contributions for its development.
2. has been instrumental in the revitalization of their community's artistic tradition.
3. has passed on to the other members of the community skills in the folk art for which the community is traditionally known.
4. community has recognized them as master and teacher of their craft.

== Awards and Incentives ==
The Gawad sa Manlilikha ng Bayan recipients, as exemplified in Republic Act No. 7355 shall receive a plaque or medal bearing the logo of the award. A duplicate of this is to be donated to and permanently displayed in the pertinent provincial museum or largest cultural center.

An initial grant of One hundred thousand pesos (P100,000.00) and Ten thousand pesos (P10,000.00) a month thereafter for life.

== Categories ==
Conferment ceremony in 2025

The categories are, but not limited to, the following categories of traditional folk arts:

- ethnomedicine
- folk architecture
- maritime transport
- weaving
- carving
- performing arts
- literature
- graphic and plastic arts
- ornament
- textile or fiber arts
- pottery.
- architecture

Other artistic expressions of traditional culture may be added, such as the case of the ethnomedicine category, which was added only in 2020.

== Recipients ==
As defined by UNESCO, the bearers of intangible cultural heritage are to be known internationally as Living Human Treasures. The Filipino counterparts of this title are the Gawad sa Manlilikha ng Bayan (GAMABA) awardees.

There are currently twenty-five declared GAMABA awardees, all of which have exemplified the highest standard in their respective field of expertise.

=== Recipients ===
Image	Name	Category / declaration	Ethnic group / community	Native of	Proclamation	Year of declaration
Ginaw Bilog in 1993	Ginaw Bilog	(For) faithfully preserving the Mangyan script and poetry by writing it on bamboo, and by promoting it in every occasion, so that this art will not be lost, but will be preserved for posterity	Hanunuo Mangyan cultural community	Mansalay, Oriental Mindoro	Presidential Proclamation No. 383, May 17, 1994	1993
	Masino Intaray	As a gifted poet, musician, epic chanter and storyteller, with the Basal and Kulilal Ensemble of Makagwa Valley, has been faithfully promoting and preserving the musical and literary tradition of the Palawan people	Pala’wan	Brooke's Point, Palawan	Presidential Proclamation No. 384, May 17, 1994	1993
	Samaon Sulaiman	Highest excellence in the art of Kutyapi playing and manifested his unwavering dedication and commitment to his art	Maguindanao	Mamasapano, Maguindanao	Presidential Proclamation No. 385, May 17, 1994	1993
	Lang Dulay	Highest excellence in the art of abaca-ikat (T’nalak) weaving and manifested her unwavering dedication and commitment to her art	T'boli	Lake Sebu, South Cotabato	Presidential Proclamation No. 1189, March 27, 1998	1998
	Salinta Monon	Highest level of excellence in the art of abaca-ikat (Abaca – ikat / Inabal) weaving and manifested her unwavering dedication and commitment to her art	Tagabawa-Bagobo community	Bansalan, Davao del Sur	Presidential Proclamation No. 1188, March 27, 1998	1998
Alonzo Saclag in 2017	Alonzo Saclag	Kalinga Musician and Dance	Kalinga	Lubuagan, Kalinga		2000
Federico Caballero in 2017	Federico Caballero	Epic Chanter of Kinaray-a and other languages	Panay-Bukidnon	Sulod- Bukidnon, Iloilo		2000
Uwang Ahadas in 2017	Uwang Ahadas	Yakan music	Yakan	Lamitan, Basilan		2000
	Darhata Sawabi	Pis syabit weaving	Tausūg	Parang, Sulu		2004
Eduardo Tubig Mutuc CNE (cropped)	Eduardo Mutuc	Pinukpuk bronze and silver metalwork	Kapampangan	Apalit, Pampanga		2004
	Haja Amina Appi	Master mat weaver	Sama-Bajau	Tandubas, Tawi-Tawi		2004
Teofilo Garcia in 2017	Teofilo Garcia	The Preservation Of The Native Headgear Known As The Tabungaw By Keeping The Tradition Alive In His Community	Ilocano	San Quintin, Abra	Presidential Proclamation No. 474, September 13, 2012	2012
Magdalena Gamayo in 2017	Magdalena Gamayo	(She) has contributed to the development of the Ilocano abel by using traditional designs in her work as well as perfecting weaving techniques that further enhance the uniqueness of these designs	Ilocano	Pinili, Ilocos Norte	Presidential Proclamation No. 474, September 13, 2012	2012
Ambalang Ausalin during the conferment of GAMABA Awards (2018)	Ambalang Ausalin	Recognized for her commitment to the safeguarding and promotion of the Yakan tennun (tapestry weaving) tradition	Yakan	Lamitan, Basilan	Presidential proclamation no. 126, signed January 6, 2017	2016
Resil Mojares and Estelita Bantilan in 2018	Estelita Tumandan Bantilan	Recognized for her commitment to the safeguarding and promotion of the B'laan igem (mat weaving) tradition	Blaan	Malapatan, Sarangani	Presidential proclamation no. 126, signed January 6, 2017	2016
Yabing Masalon Dulo during the 2018 conferment of GAMABA Awards	Yabing Masalon Dulo	Recognized for her commitment to the safeguarding and promotion of the B'laan mabal tabih (ikat weaving) tradition	Blaan	Polomolok, South Cotabato	Presidential proclamation no. 126, signed January 6, 2017	2016
	Adelita Bagcal	Recognized for her commitment to safeguarding and promoting the Dallot and other ilocano oral traditions	Ilocano	Banna, Ilocos Norte	Presidential Proclamation NO. 427, December 15, 2023	2023
2024 National Arts and Crafts Fair	Abina Coguit	Suyam embroidery tradition of the Agusan Manobo	Agusan Manobo	La Paz, Agusan del Sur	Presidential Proclamation NO. 427, December 15, 2023	2023
	Sakinur-ain Delasas	Recognized for her commitment to safeguarding and promoting the Same igal (dance) tradition	Sama-Bajau	Bongao, Tawi-Tawi	Presidential Proclamation NO. 427, December 15, 2023	2023
	Bundos Fara	Recognized for his commitment to safeguarding and promoting the T'boli temwel (brasscasting) tradition	T'boli	Lake Sebu, South Cotabato	Presidential Proclamation NO. 427, December 15, 2023	2023
	Marife Ganahon	Recognized for her commitment to safeguarding and promoting the Higanon ikaw (mat weaving) tradition	Higaonon	Malaybalay, Bukidnon	Presidential Proclamation NO. 427, December 15, 2023	2023
	Amparo Mabanag	Recognized for her commitment to safeguarding and promoting the Ga'dang manu'bak and ameru (beadworks and embroidery) traditions	Ga'dang	Paracelis, Mountain Province	Presidential Proclamation NO. 427, December 15, 2023	2023
	Samporonia Madanlo	Recognized for her commitment to safeguarding and promoting the Mandaya dagmay (ikat weaving) tradition	Mandaya	Caraga, Davao Oriental	Presidential Proclamation NO. 427, December 15, 2023	2023
	Barbara Ofong	Recognized for her commitment to safeguarding and promoting the T'boli t'nalak (ikat weaving) tradition	T'boli	Lake Sebu, South Cotabato	Presidential Proclamation NO. 427, December 15, 2023	2023
	Rosie Sula	Recognized for her commitment to safeguarding and promoting the T'boli lingon (chanting) tradition	T'boli	Lake Sebu, South Cotabato	Presidential Proclamation NO. 427, December 15, 2023	

== Lapses in the Award System ==
There have been multiple constructive criticisms of the system by which the award was crafted. Critics have argued against the discriminatory reason that created a separation between those implied as "traditional", "indigenous", and "craft" arts (where recipients are given the Gawad Manlilikha Award or National Living Treasures Award) with those implied as "fine arts" (where recipients are given the National Artists Award). The separation of the fields have caused discrimination, rather than inclusion, since "traditional" arts should be on the same merit and system as those identified as "fine arts", which is a term mostly applied by older Filipino crafters of the law, who crafted the GAMABA law, as "Western art". Critics argue that it is insignificant to still discriminate between the two and call one as the "fine arts" and the other as "craft".

The terminology used in the award is also a source of discourse and problematique. "Manlilika" directly means "artist", making the GAMABA Award and the National Artist Award the same thing by translation, but the two are still separated by a system that views "traditional" arts as not "fine arts", which the system only applied to "Western arts", diminishing and discriminating actual traditional Filipino arts in the process. While in doing so, the same system itself notes that the two awards have allegedly the "same" ranking.

Critics have argued also why is it impossible for the system to institute the two set of arts into one national art award system, since the distinction has only increased the gap between what the system views as "fine arts" and "indigenous" arts. Critics also argue why there is a system in place which makes traditional artists (manlilika ng bayan) unqualified to be declared as a "National Artist", a title that the system only bestows to those who lean towards the "fine arts" or "Western arts". As per the National Artist Award criteria, those who can be declared as National Artist are those who "build a Filipino sense of nationhood; distinguish themselves; create a significant body of excellent work; and be nationally recognized", while those that can be declared as GAMABA are those attributed as "indigenous, "folk", or "heritage". These two sets of distinction, critics argue, has created confusion since National Artists cannot qualify for GAMABA, yet GAMABA awardees are technically qualified for the other although still barred from it. Scholar Magpantay notes on the two art form groups and the problematique on what the system has imposed:

The divergence of these two awards is a reflection on the wide gap that still exists between the “fine” forms versus our “original” forms. It still has the trace of the colonial mindset as we appreciate the “foreign” form versus our own. How many people know about the “Order of the National Artists” compared to those who have just known the “Gawad Manlilikha ng Bayan”? Why does one enjoy much spotlight, while the artists and arts of the other still need protection from other pressing socio-political issues? Moreover, why do the people of this cultural heritage still fight for their lands, while their art and culture is fetishized and commoditized? These questions are both hard and easy to answer, it is easy to explain by someone who sees the dialectics superficially, but a more deeper answer silences us on the larger narrative of the suffering not just of our “own” art forms but of our own people.

—

Unlike the Philippines, in other countries, such as Thailand, the "traditional" arts and the "Western arts" are both considered as "fine arts". Thailand has instituted all its traditional arts and "Western" arts into a single Thai National Artist Award system, improving the outlook and expansion of the traditional arts in the process.

Another criticism towards the GAMABA system is its awarding system that has effectively blocked deceased traditional artists from receiving posthumous conferment on par with the National Artist Award. Non-traditional artists who have passed away can still be posthumously conferred the National Artist Award and be honored for time immemorial in the national artistic roster, but "traditional" or "indigenous" artists cannot be posthumously conferred the Gawad Manlilikha (GAMABA) Award, denying them of their place in the national artistic roster. Counter-critics argue that the reason is because the GAMABA Award can only be given to "living" traditional artists as the award is only for "Living National Treasures". The "living" counter-argument has been criticized as it showed a double standard, where the term and the system itself have only created a limited box for traditional artists, blocking them from posthumous conferment and their rightful place in the national roster, while still allowing posthumous conferment of the "same-level" National Artist Award to non-traditional artists.

== Gallery ==
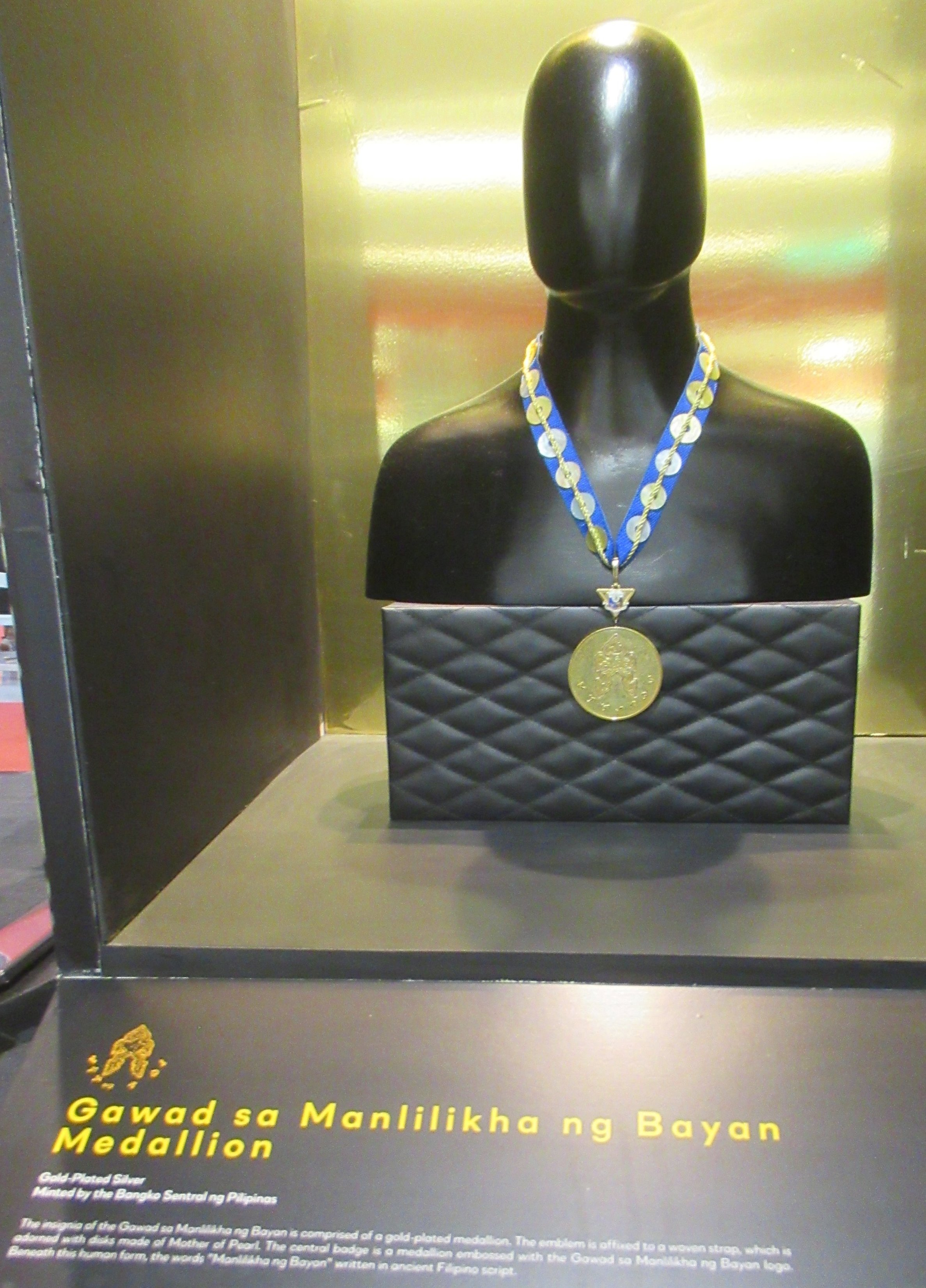
The GAMABA medallon

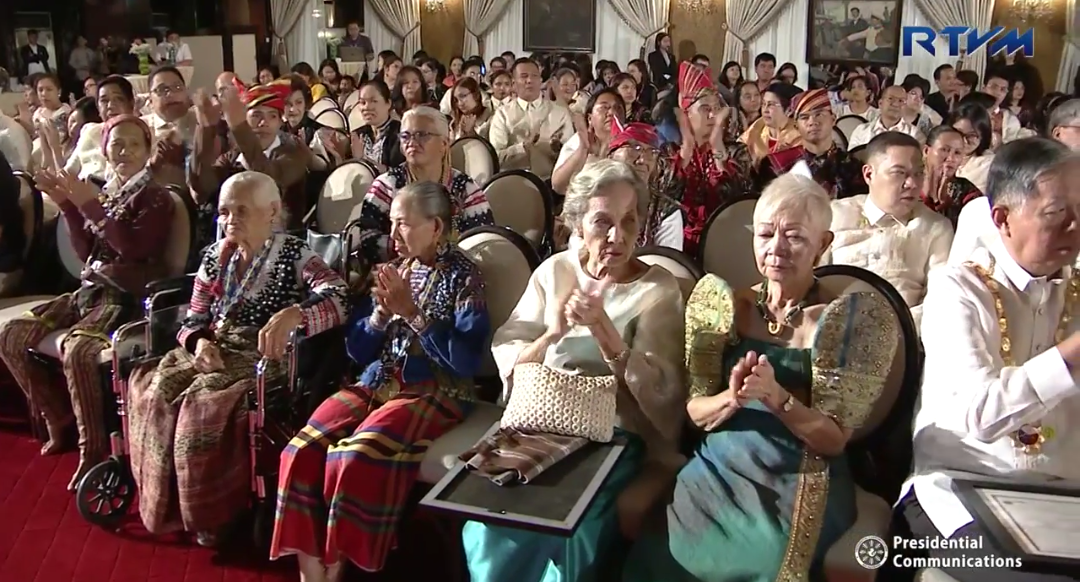
Conferment of the GAMABA in 2018

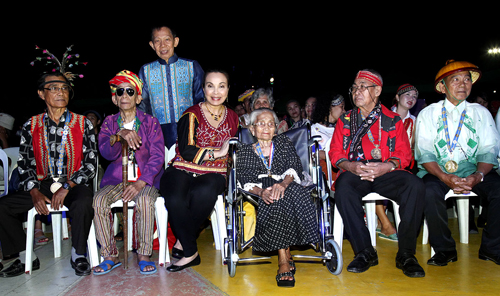
Senator Loren Legarda along with the GAMABA awardees (2017)

== See also ==
- National Artist of the Philippines
- Art in the Philippines
- Tourism in the Philippines
- Living Human Treasure
