= Barbara Ofong =

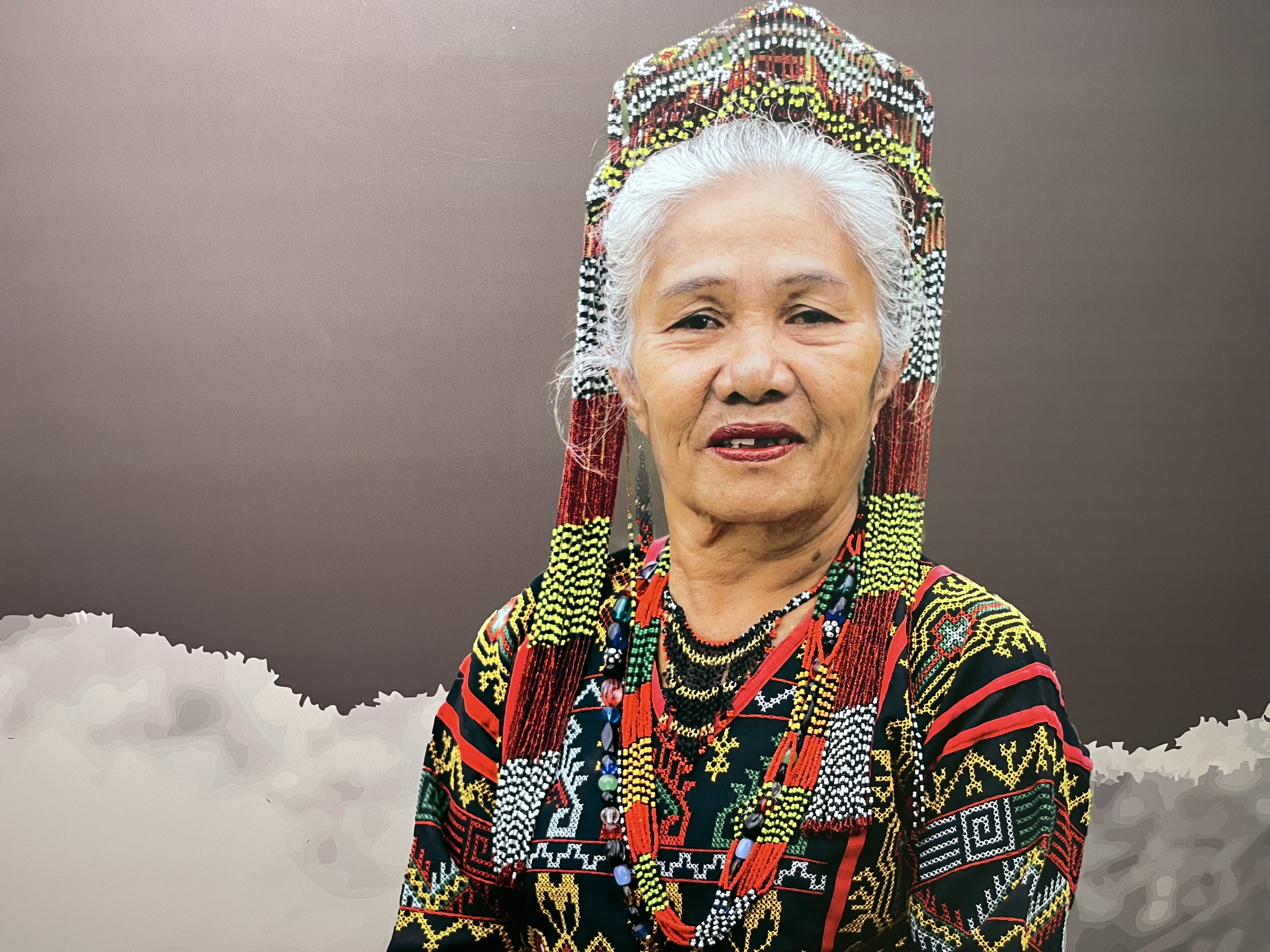
- Barbara Ofong in 2026
- Born: May 16, 1956 (age 69)
- Known for: Textile
- Style: T'nalak
- Awards: National Living Treasure Award; 2023

Barbara Kibed Ofong (born May 16, 1956) is a Filipino master textile weaver who specialize in T'nalak.

== Background ==
Ofong is a Tboli woman from Lake Sebu, South Cotabato and is known for the traditional abaca weaving art of T'nalak. Ofong created at least 90 patterns purportedly through the influence of the spirit of abaca, Fu Dalu via dreams.

The National Commission for Culture and the Arts conferred Ofong the Gawad sa Manlilikha ng Bayan award in December 2023. She is the second T'nalak weaver to receive the recognition after Lang Dulay
