= Rosie Sula =

Rosie Sula Boi Lemingon
- Born: May 12, 1968 (age 57)
- Origin: Lake Sebu, South Cotabato
- Genres: Folk
- Instruments: Vocals
- Awards: Gawad sa Manlilikha ng Bayan

Rosie Godwino Sula (Tboli: Boi Lemingon; born May 12, 1968) is a Filipino chanter, musician, composer, and dancer.

== Background ==
Sula is a Tboli woman from Lake Sebu, South Cotabato. In the Tboli language, Sula is known as Boi Lemingon. Boi means princess or lady. She is a chanter who performs the Tboli practice of lingon, including lingon hololok or epic chants such as "Tudbulul".

She came from the Godwino clan which is reputed in their community in the field of music, learning chanting and storytelling from her father at eight years old.

Sula is the founder of Libun Hulung Matul and Gono Hofo Heritage Center and is also a teacher.

The National Commission for Culture and the Arts conferred Sula the Gawad sa Manlilikha ng Bayan award in December 2023. She is the second T'nalak weaver to receive the recognition after Lang Dulay
