= Bundos Fara =

Filipino metalworker (born 1965)

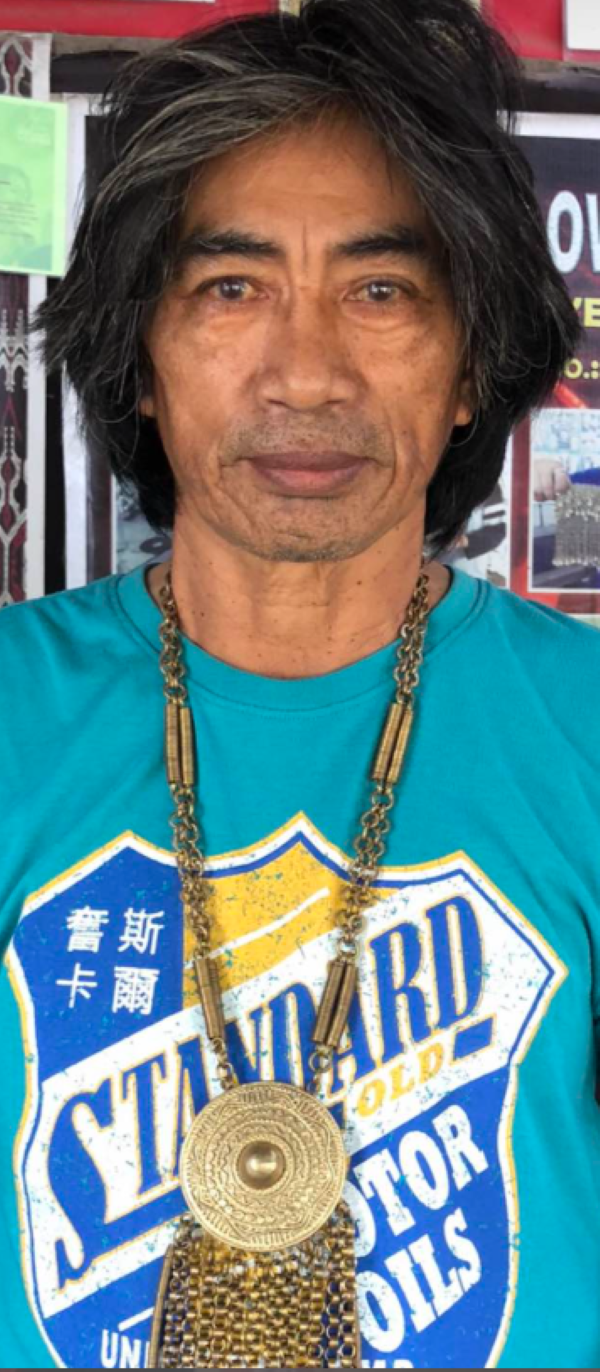
- Bundos Fara, February 2024
- Born: March 21, 1965 (age 60)
- Known for: Tboli brassmaking (Kem tau temwel)
- Awards: National Living Treasure Award; 2023

Bundos Bansil Fara (born March 21 1965) is a Filipino metalworker who is noted for brass casting.

== Background ==
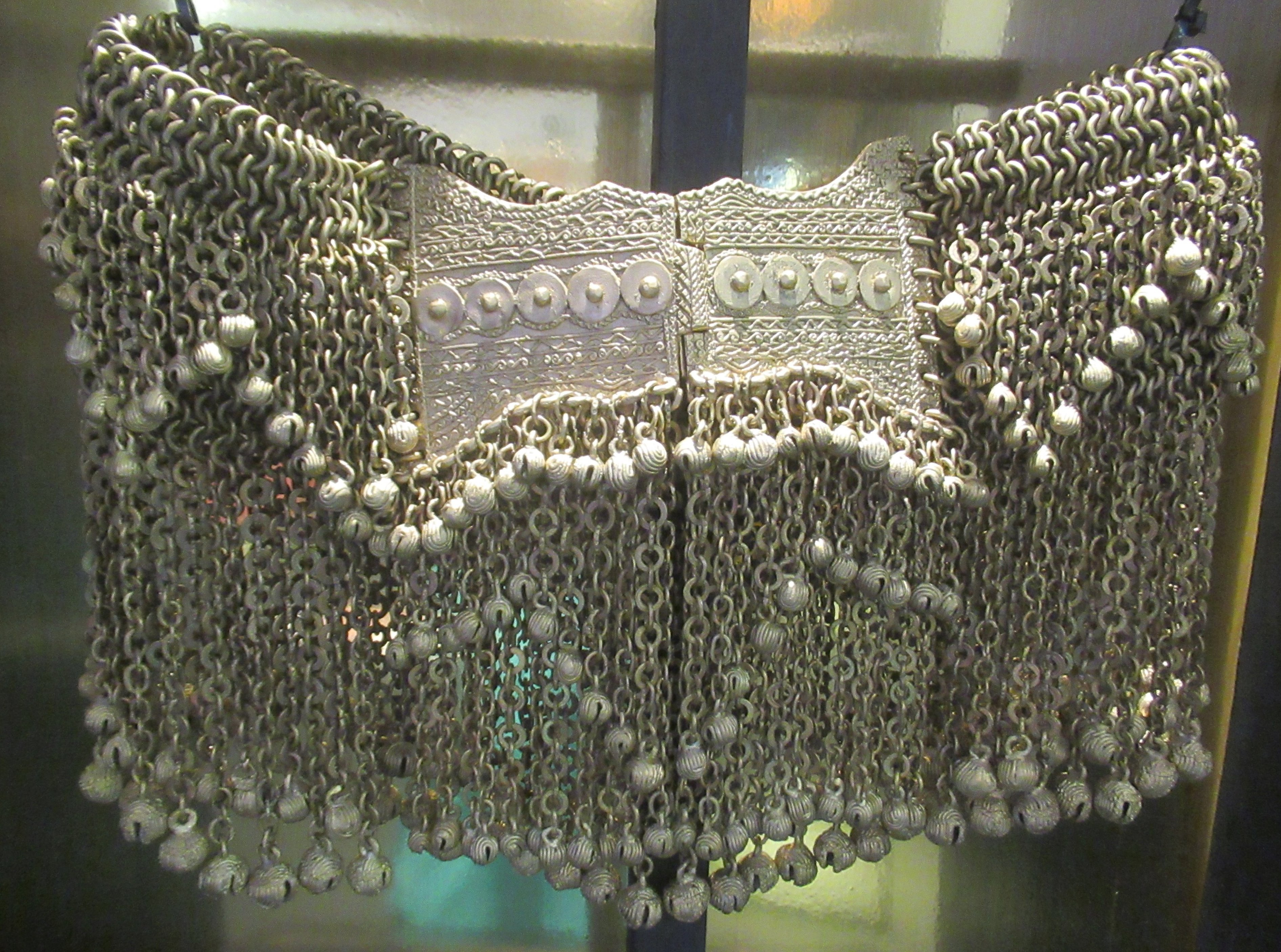
Brass belt by Fara.

Fara is a Tboli man in Lake Sebu, South Cotabato. He comes from a lineage of metalworkers which includes his father and grandfather. The Tboli are customarily known for recycling metals such as broken agong (gongs) for their metalwork. The resulting work are either made of brass or an alloy of other materials such as brass, bronze, steel.

The technique of metalwork is called kem tau temwel. According to Tboli religion, the technique was bestowed to the Tboli by the metallurgy deity, Ginton.
