= Mabanag =

Mabanag is a surname. Notable people with the surname include:

- Alejo Mabanag, Filipino lawyer and politician
- Amparo Mabanag, Filipino beadworker and embroiderer
