= Salinta Monon =

Filipino textile weaver (1920–2009)

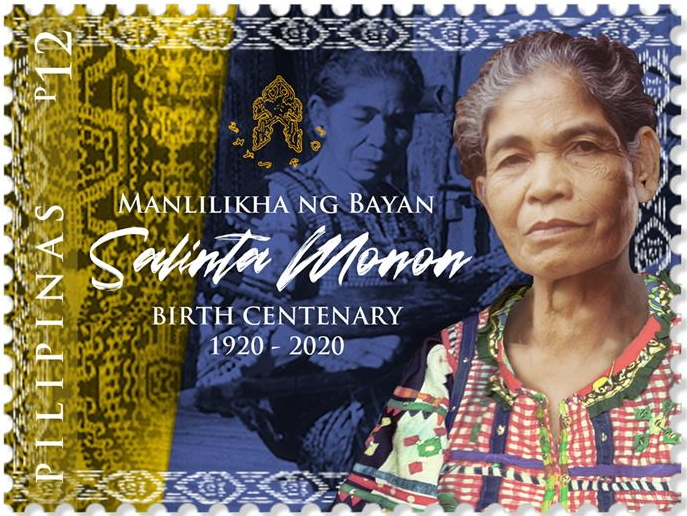
- Monon on a 2020 stamp of the Philippines
- Born: December 12, 1920; Bansalan, Davao, Philippine Islands
- Died: June 4, 2009 (aged 88); Bansalan, Davao del Sur, Philippines
- Known for: Bagobo Tagabawa textile
- Style: Traditional Bagobo-Tagabawa design
- Spouse: Agton Monon (m. 1946; d. 1970s)
- Awards: National Living Treasure Award; 1998

Salinta Monon (December 12, 1920 – June 4, 2009) was a Filipino textile weaver who was the one of two recipients of the National Living Treasures Award in 1998. She was known for her Bagobo-Tagabawa textiles and was known as the "last Bagobo weaver".

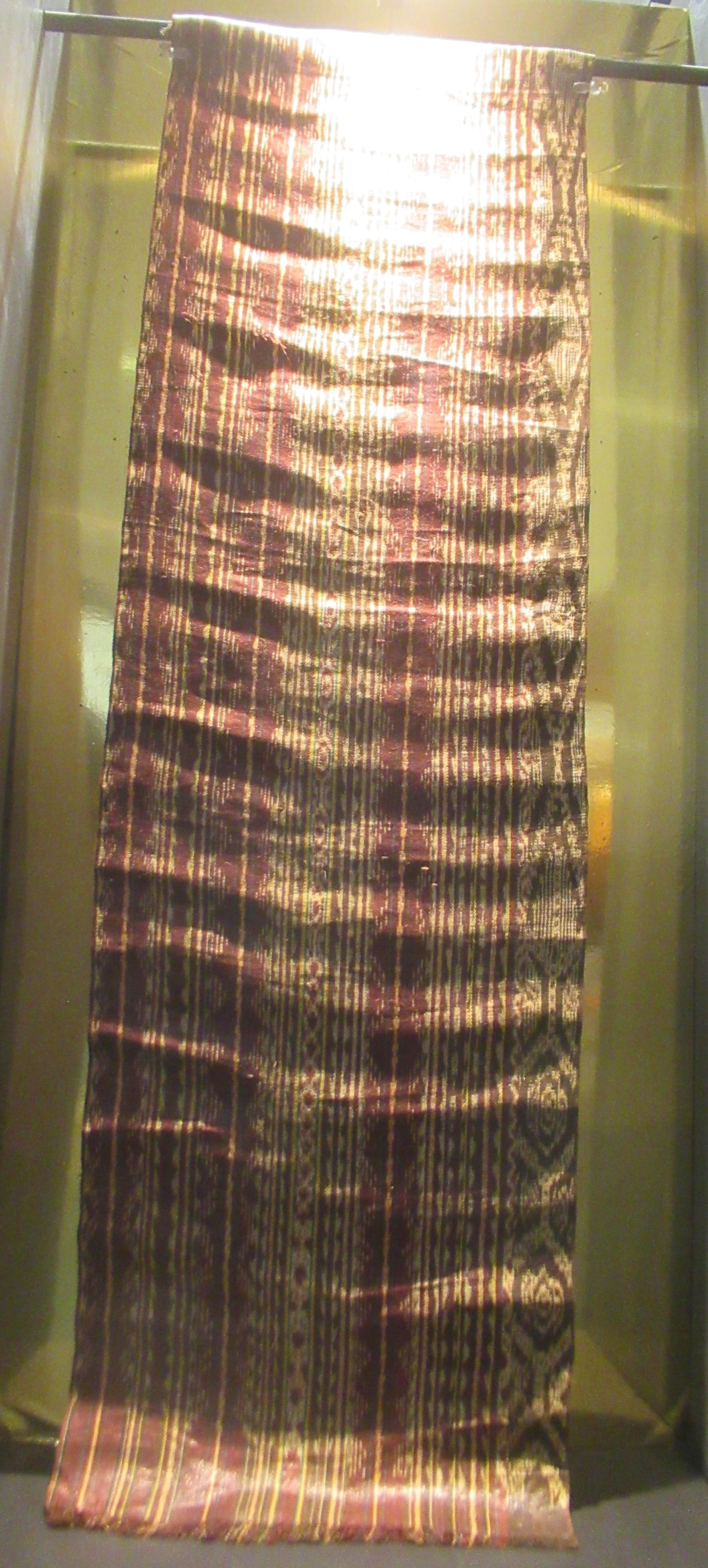
Monon's Inabal

== Background ==
Monon was born on December 12, 1920, and grew up in Bitaug, Bansalan in Davao del Sur and watched her mother weave ikat a traditional abaca fabric when she was a child, She asked her mother how to use the loom at age 12 and learned how to weave within a few months. She weaved a design for three to four months. In a month she could weave fabric which could be used for a single abaca tube skirt which measures 3.5 x 0.42 meters. Her favorite design is the binuwaya or crocodile which is said to be among the most difficult to weave.

According to Cherry Quizon, an anthropologist based in New York, the origin of Monon's design can be dated back as early as the 1910s.

Monon was awarded the National Living Treasures Award in 1998. She died on June 4, 2009.

President Rodrigo Duterte declared a year-long celebration named "Centennial Year of Salinta Monon" from December 12, 2021, in her honor.

== Personal life ==
Due to her reputation as a weaver, Agton Monon, a farmer and her husband, had to pay a high bride price to her father Datu Bansalan Barra for him to be allowed to marry her. The two got married on July 4, 1946, and had six children. Salinta Monon had to manage the farm after her husband died in the 1970s..
