= Ambalang Ausalin =

Filipino master weaver (1943–2022)

Apuh Ambalang Ausalin
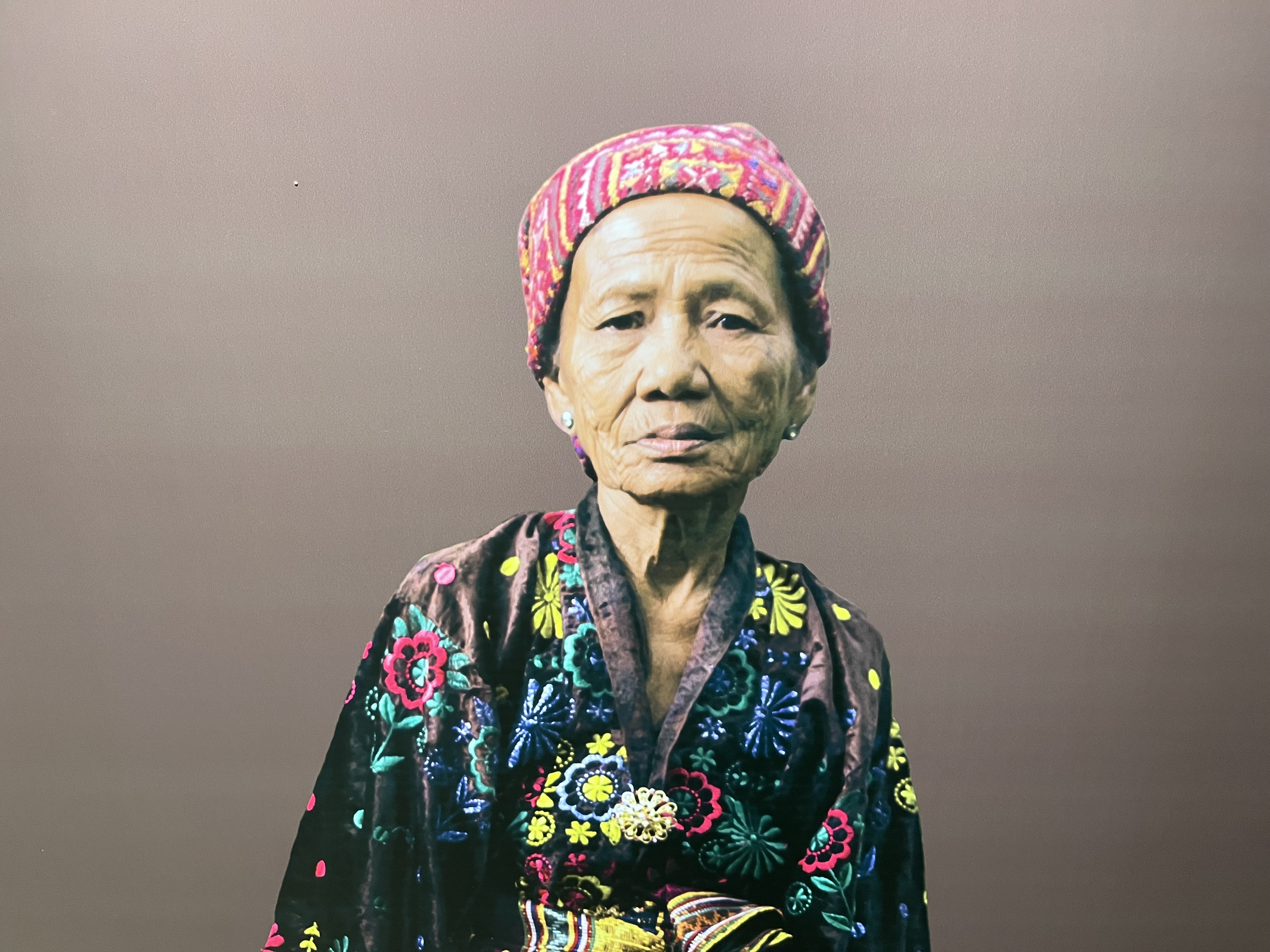
- Ambalang Ausalin in 2026
- Born: March 4, 1943
- Died: February 18, 2022 (aged 78); Lamitan, Basilan, Philippines
- Known for: Textile
- Style: Sinaluan and sputangan Yakan traditional weaving
- Awards: National Living Treasure Award; 2016

Ambalang Ausalin (March 4, 1943 – February 18, 2022) was a Filipino master weaver from the city of Lamitan, Basilan.

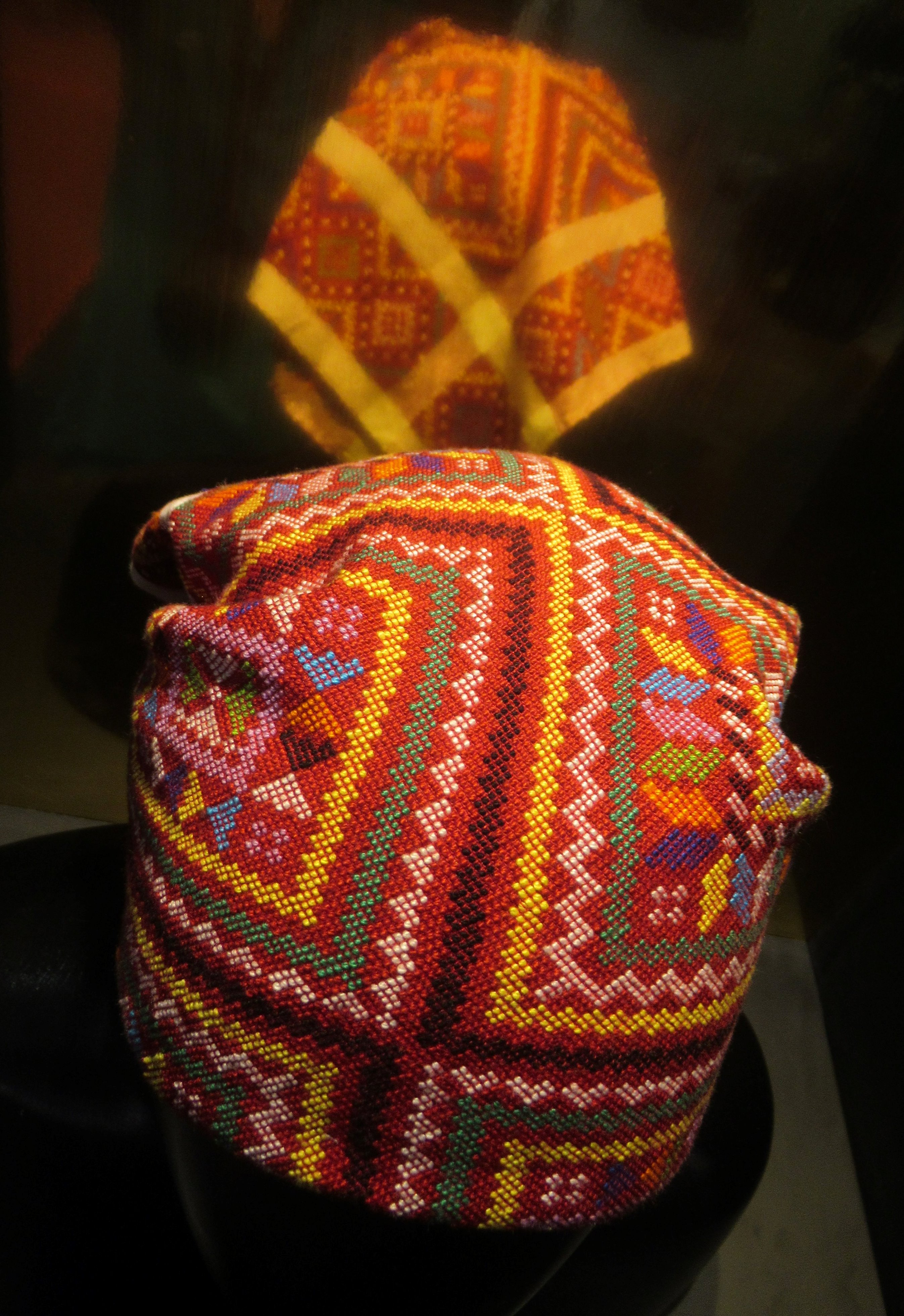
Ausalin's Seputangan NCCA

== Biography ==
Ambalang was renowned for her mastery of the crafts of sinaluan and sputangan, two of the most intricately designed textiles of the indigenous Yakan community. She learned weaving through her mother, who was previously reputed to be the best weaver in Basilan and first practiced the craft by using coconut strips.

Ausalin was given the National Living Treasure Award by the Philippines through the National Commission for Culture and the Arts in 2016.

== Final years and legacy ==
She died of lingering illness at her home in Parangbasak, Lamitan, on February 18, 2022, at the age of 78.

In June 2024, the Inauguration of the Gamaba Weaving Center and the Ambalang Museum featuring Yakan culture was led by her eldest son Berty Ausalin in Lamitan. She is recognized as the master of the Yakan “tennun” (woven cloth).
