= Lubuagan =

Municipality in Kalinga, Philippines

- Municipality
- Municipality of Lubuagan
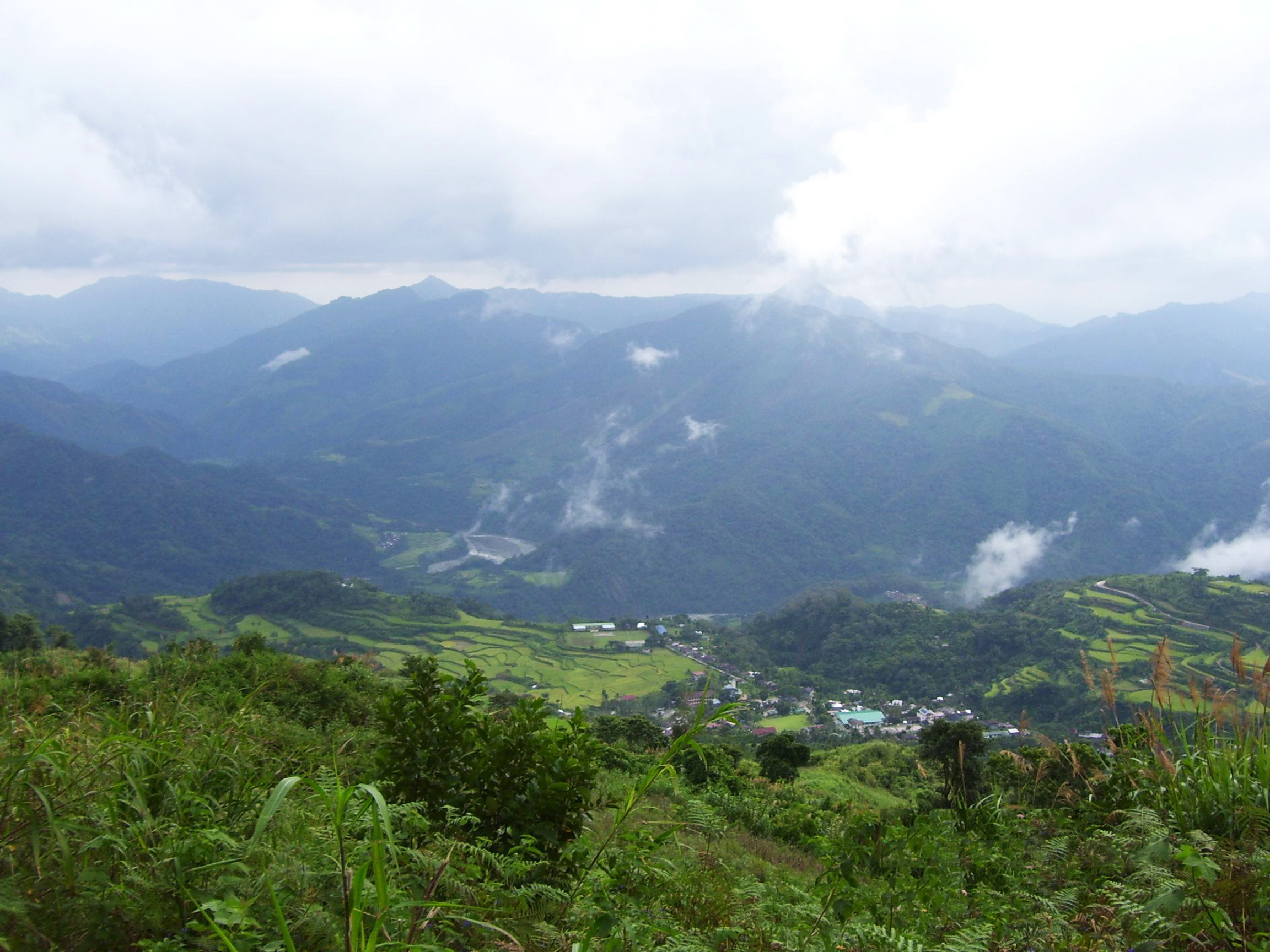
- Lubuagan from the Magmag-an Pass

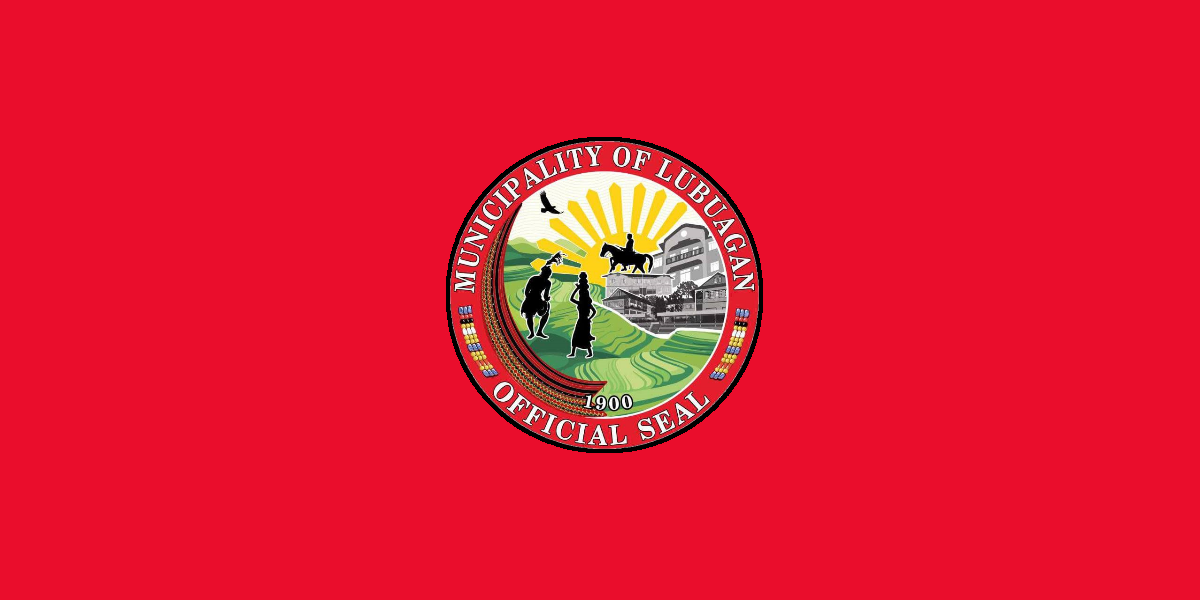
- Flag

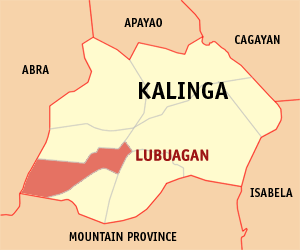
- Map of Kalinga with Lubuagan highlighted
- Interactive map of Lubuagan
- Location within the Philippines
- Coordinates: 17°21′N 121°11′E
- Country: Philippines
- Region: Cordillera Administrative Region
- Province: Kalinga
- District: Lone district
- Founded: 1905
- Barangays: 9 (see Barangays)

Government
  - Type: Sangguniang Bayan
  - Mayor: Joel B. Tagaotao
  - Vice Mayor: Oliver D. Dickly
  - Representative: Caroline B. Agyao
  - Municipal Council: Members: Randy D. Ao-wat; Clarissa A. Ocan; Riesel B. Tocyapao; Simi L. Colayot; Victor S. Sapao; Angelito S. Anton; Marlon P. Gomez; Wildy C. Wansi
  - Electorate: 9,890 voters (2025)

Area
  - Total: 234.20 km^{2} (90.43 sq mi)
- Elevation: 820 m (2,690 ft)
- Highest elevation: 1,880 m (6,170 ft)
- Lowest elevation: 348 m (1,142 ft)

Population (2024 census)
  - Total: 8,660
  - Density: 37.0/km^{2} (95.8/sq mi)
  - Households: 1,982

Economy
  - Income class: 4th municipal income class
  - Poverty incidence: 8.75% (2023)
  - Revenue: ₱ 131.3 million (2024)
  - Assets: ₱ 496.6 million (2024)
  - Expenditure: ₱ 102.9 million (2024)
  - Liabilities: ₱ 140.3 million (2024)

Service provider
  - Electricity: Kalinga - Apayao Electric Cooperative (KAELCO)
- Time zone: UTC+8 (PST)
- ZIP code: 3802
- PSGC: 1403206000
- IDD : area code: +63 (0)74
- Native languages: Ilocano; Tagalog
- Website: www.lubuagan.gov.ph

Lubuagan, officially the Municipality of Lubuagan (Ilocano: Munisipio ti Lubuagan, Filipino: Bayan ng Lubuagan), is a municipality in the province of Kalinga, Philippines. According to the 2024 census, it has a population of 8,660 people.

The municipality served as the seat of the National Government from March 6 to May 17, 1900, during the time of Gen. Emilio Aguinaldo. It is located at 800 metres (2,600 ft) above sea level in the southern part of Kalinga and in the heart of the Cordillera. It has a land area of 23,420 hectares (57,900 acres).

== History ==
Spanish Rule was never established in Lubuagan during its 300-year occupation of the Philippines. However, Emilio Aguinaldo, president of the erstwhile First Philippine Republic made Lubuagan the seat of government for 73 days, from 6 March to 18 May 1900, before his escape and eventual capture at Palanan, Isabela, on 23 March 1901.

Upon the assumption of the United States of America as colonial power over the Philippines, the Township of Lubuagan was established in 1905 and administered via the sub provincial government of Lepanto-Bontoc sub-province. Lt. Governor E. A. Eckman, an American ex-soldier was the Chief Executive of the sub-province.

In 1907, Kalinga was separated and organized as a distinct sub-province from Lepanto-Bontoc. Franklin Walter Hale was appointed the first Lt. Governor to establish a civil government in Kalinga. Hale initially established his office in Bulanao, but moved to Lubuagan in 1909 following an outbreak of cholera and malaria. Hale whom the people baptized and fondly called Sapao, first organized his police contingent from and among the tribal pangats and headmen from the different villages of Kalinga to help them tame recalcitrant natives.

Hale served Kalinga up to the end of July 1915. He was replaced by Samuel Kane, who served for a brief period and was replaced by Alex Gilfilan in September 1916, who was later on replaced by Deputy Governor Thomas Blanco, a Filipino. In 1924, Nicasio Balinag took over as Deputy Governor.

The colonial government notably beginning with the administration of Hale up to the Commonwealth government was considered the golden years of Lubuagan, which was designated the capital town of the sub-province before Tabuk rose to its present status as the center of learning and government activities. Lubuagan at that time was the center of education, culture, commerce and trade. The founding of the Kalinga Academy in 1927, a secondary school run by American Missionaries and the St. Teresita's School in 1929, a Catholic Primary and High School managed by the CICM Belgian Missionaries bolstered the luster of Lubuagan. It was also in Lubuagan where the first instruction of higher learning in the old Mountain Province was established.

During World War II, Japanese forces occupied Lubuagan in May 1942.

In 1945, Lubuagan was bombed by American planes resulting in the destruction of the Lubuagan Central School which was then occupied by the Japanese. St. Peter's church, its convent and two more buildings within its compound were all burned to the ground.

== Geography ==
Lubuagan is situated 6.44 kilometres (4.00 mi) from the provincial capital Tabuk, and 471.88 kilometres (293.21 mi) from the country's capital city of Manila.

=== Barangays ===
Lubuagan is politically subdivided into 9 barangays. Each barangay consists of puroks and some have sitios.

- Antonio Canao
- Dangoy
- Lower Uma
- Mabilong
- Mabongtot
- Poblacion
- Tanglag
- Uma del Norte (Western Uma)
- Upper Uma

=== Climate ===
Climate data for Lubuagan, Kalinga
Month	Jan	Feb	Mar	Apr	May	Jun	Jul	Aug	Sep	Oct	Nov	Dec	Year
Mean daily maximum °C (°F)	21 (70)	22 (72)	25 (77)	27 (81)	27 (81)	27 (81)	26 (79)	26 (79)	25 (77)	24 (75)	23 (73)	21 (70)	25 (76)
Mean daily minimum °C (°F)	16 (61)	16 (61)	17 (63)	18 (64)	20 (68)	20 (68)	20 (68)	20 (68)	20 (68)	19 (66)	18 (64)	17 (63)	18 (65)
Average precipitation mm (inches)	78 (3.1)	60 (2.4)	49 (1.9)	51 (2.0)	194 (7.6)	197 (7.8)	209 (8.2)	226 (8.9)	185 (7.3)	180 (7.1)	143 (5.6)	183 (7.2)	1,755 (69.1)
Average rainy days	15.6	12.5	11.8	12.5	21.0	23.3	25.2	26.1	22.6	17.1	16.7	19.6	224
Source: Meteoblue

== Demographics ==
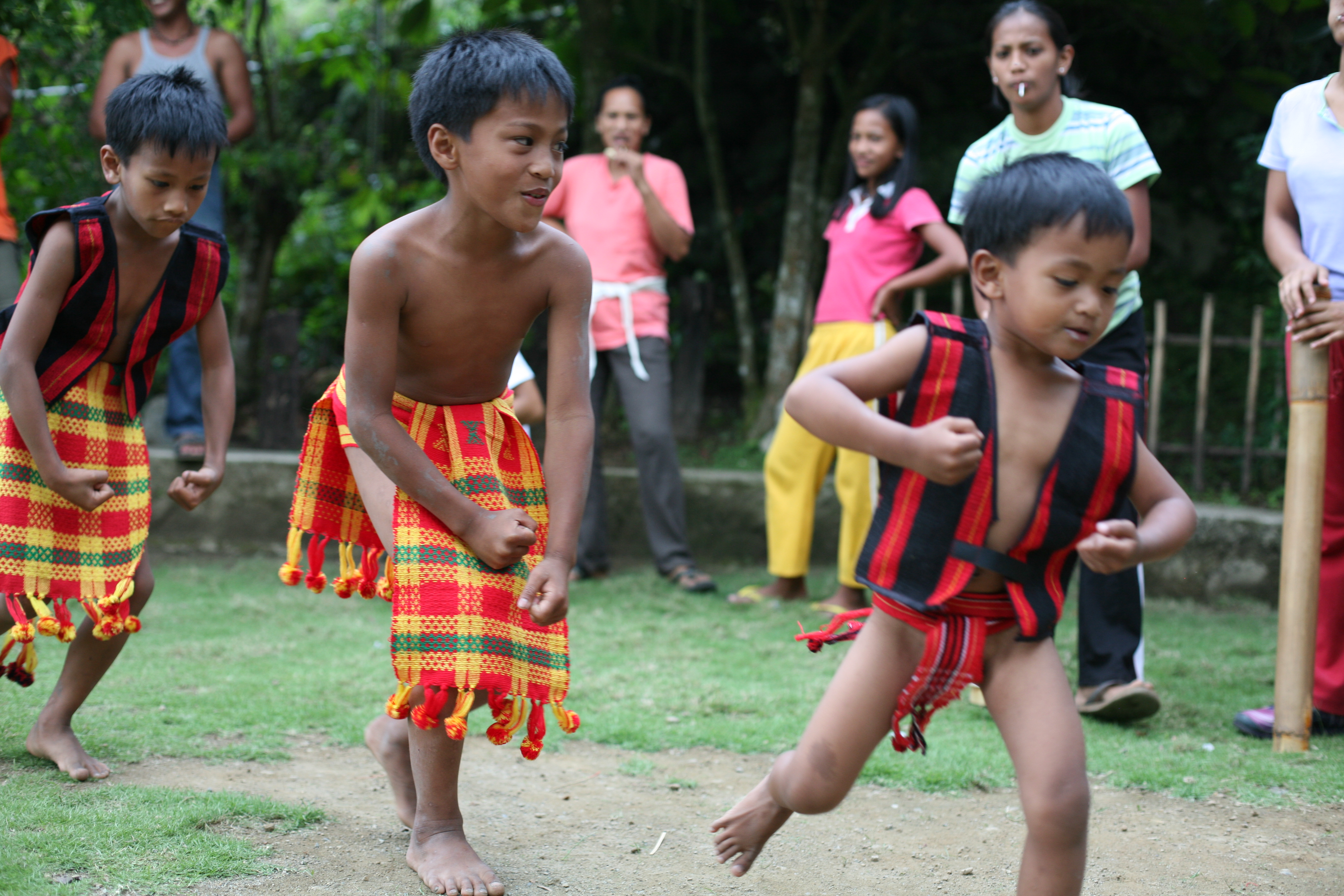
Children from Lubuagan, Kalinga perform the muscle dance.

Population census of Lubuagan
Year	Pop.	±% p.a.
1918	8,874	—
1939	7,366	−0.88%
1948	7,821	+0.67%
1960	10,289	+2.31%
1970	7,236	−3.45%
1975	7,780	+1.46%
1980	8,545	+1.89%
1990	9,189	+0.73%
1995	9,897	+1.40%
2000	9,875	−0.05%
2007	10,183	+0.42%
2010	9,369	−2.99%
2015	8,733	−1.33%
2020	9,323	+1.39%
2024	8,660	−1.76%
Source: Philippine Statistics Authority

In the 2024 census, the population of Lubuagan was 8,660 people, with a density of 37 inhabitants per square kilometre or 96 inhabitants per square mile.

== Economy ==
Poverty incidence of Lubuagan (%)

Source: Philippine Statistics Authority

Lubuagan's economy relies heavily on agriculture and traditional crafts. Agricultural production of Lubuagan includes rice, corn, coffee, and tomatoes. Livestock raising is significant for local consumption and supplementary income of Lubuagan's farmers. Local women engage in backstrap weaving, producing textiles and garments.

== Government ==
=== Local government ===
Lubuagan, belonging to the lone congressional district of the province of Kalinga, is governed by a mayor designated as its local chief executive and by a municipal council as its legislative body in accordance with the Local Government Code. The mayor, vice mayor, and the councilors are elected directly by the people through an election which is being held every three years.

=== Elected officials ===
Members of the Municipal Council (2025–2028)
Position	Name
Congressman	Caroline B. Agyao
Mayor	Joel B. Tagaotao
Vice-Mayor	Oliver D. Dickly
Councilors	Randy D. Ao-wat
Councilors	Clarissa A. Ocan
Councilors	Riesel B. Tocyapao
Councilors	Simi L. Colayot
Councilors	Victor S. Sapao
Councilors	Angelito S. Anton
Councilors	Marlon P. Gomez
Councilors	Wildy C. Wansi

== Tourism ==
- St. Theresita's School, a Roman Catholic school established by the CICM missionaries in 1925, was once the educational center of the Cordillera. It was also used as a military outpost by the Japanese, Filipino and American forces during World War II.
- Mabilong Weaver's Village is the center of the ethnic weaving industry in the province. It showcases colorful ethnic backstrap weaving.
- The town has extensive and scenic rice terraces (Pon-e Rice Terraces and Gapis Rice Terraces) cut into the mountains, rising 2,000 feet (610 m) from the Chico River bed.
- Batong Buhay Mines.
- Aguinaldo Hill was Emilio Aguinaldo's command post during his 72-day stay in the town. It has a panoramic view of several barangays in Pinukpuk.
- Awichon Mesa, a plateau situated at Barangay Upper Uma, between Pasil and Lubuagan, is an archaeological site where bones of a prehistoric elephant were found. It was also the landing site of American forces during World War II.
- Cadamayan Falls, at Barangay Western Uma, serves as the natural boundary of Pasil, Lubuagan and Tinglayan.
- Tiwod Spring, the "Fertility Twin Spring", is believed to be bestow children to childless couples, who take a bath on mornings and drink from it.
- Tongango Caves consists of several chambers connecting the mountains of Lubuagan, Sumadel and Tulgao.
- Belalao Mabilong View contains a view of Lubuagan Village. Visitors who come by night are said to be surprised by a sudden appearance of a lost city in the mountain.
- Manangol Viewpoint, at the top of Manangol Hill, has a panoramic view of the Chico River, Tinglayan and the rice terraces seated at the basement of the overlapping mountain.
- The Poway View Deck, at the boundary of Pasil and Lubuagan, has a view of the Pasil River.
- The Pudpud Chico Viewpoint, at the Lubuagan Central School, has a view of the Chico River and the aborted Chico Hydroelectric Dam.
- The Lubuagan Museum, located in an old American house, showcases a selection of old Chinese pottery as well as other Kalinga products.

== Culture ==
- Laga Festival- From "laga", a Kalinga word which means to weave. Celebrated annually, typically in March. It is a two or three-day celebration which showcases the culture, arts, and history of Lubuagan.

== Education ==
The Lubuagan Schools District Office governs all educational institutions within the municipality. It oversees the management and operations of all private and public, from primary to secondary schools.

=== Primary and elementary schools ===
- Ag-agama Elementary School
- Colong Primary School
- Dangoy Elementary School
- Dugnac Primary School
- Latawan Elementary School
- Lubuagan Central School
- Mabilong Elementary School
- Mabongtot Elementary School
- Mallongan Elementary School
- Manangol Elementary School
- Payao Primary School
- Roadside Elementary School
- Sukiap Elementary School
- Tanglag Elementary School
- Uma Elementary School

=== Secondary schools ===
- Kalinga Academy
- Lubuagan National High School
- Senior High School in Lubuagan
- St. Theresita's School of Lubuagan

== Notable personalities ==
- Alonzo Saclag – musician and dancer, National Living Treasures Awardee
- Jean Claude Saclag – martial artist
