= Adelita Bagcal =

Filipino chanter

- Born: Adelita Romualdo; January 16, 1946 (age 80)
- Origin: Banna, Ilocos Norte
- Genres: Folk
- Instruments: Vocals
- Awards: Gawad sa Manlilikha ng Bayan

Adelita Romualdo Bagcal (born January 16, 1946) is a Filipino chanter specializing in Dallot and other Ilocano oral tradition.

== Background ==
Bagcal is from Banna, Ilocos Norte. She first learned the traditional Ilocano chant of Dallot typically used in courtship and marriage when she was 15 years old from her grandmother. Dallot is also performed in birthdays and other types of feasts.

Bagcal also performs the Ilocano lullaby practice of duayya and mourning ritual art of dung-aw. She is known for her efforts for preserving Ilocano oral traditions by training people in Dallot at the Banna National High School including her grandson Jessie Bagcal who became a public school teacher.

The Gunglo Dagiti Mannurat nga Ilokano or the Association of Ilokano Writers in the Philippines – Ilocos Norte nominated her for the Gawad sa Manlilikha ng Bayan in 2021. The National Commission for Culture and the Arts conferred her the award in December 2023 becoming the second person from the Ilocos region to get the distinction after weave maker Magdalena Gamayo.

== Personal life ==
Bagcal is a widow.
