= Uwang Ahadas =

Filipino folk musician (1945–2022)

- Uwang Ahadas in 2017

Background information
- Born: February 15, 1945
- Origin: Lamitan, Basilan, Philippines
- Died: October 29, 2022 (aged 77)
- Genres: Folk
- Instruments: abbang; agung; kwintangan
- Awards: Gawad sa Manlilikha ng Bayan

Uwang Ahadas (February 15, 1945 – October 29, 2022) was a Filipino folk musician of the Yakan people who was a recipient of the National Living Treasures Award.

== Background ==
Uwang Ahadas was born on February 15, 1945. He went near blind when he was five years old. People in his community believed that this was due to retribution of nature spirits which lived in Bohe Libaken, a creek where Ahadas frequently bathed. Ahadas along with his sibling musicians were taught how to play Yakan traditional instruments as children. He first learned how to play the gabbang, a wooden bamboo instrument similar to the xylophone then learned how to play the agung an instrument traditionally played by Yakan men.

By age 20, Ahadas had already mastered the kwintangan which is considered as the most important Yakan musical instrument despite the instrument being traditionally reserved for women. He could also play the tuntungan.

Ahadas taught his children how to play Yakan traditional instruments, including Darna who would later become a teacher of these traditions herself. Ahadas went on to promote these traditions outside his native town of Lamitan, Basilan.

Ahadas was recognized as a National Living Treasure by the National Commission for Culture and the Arts in the year 2000. He died on October 29, 2022, at the age of 77.
