= Ginaw Bilog =

Filipino poet (1953–2003)

- ᜤᜲᜨᜯ᜴ ᜪᜲᜮᜳᜤ᜴
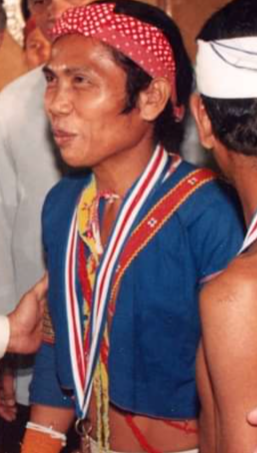
- Bilog in 1993
- Born: January 3, 1953
- Died: June 3, 2003 (aged 50)
- Occupation: Poet
- Writing career
- Language: Mangyan
- Genre: Ambahan
- Notable awards: Gawad sa Manlilikha ng Bayan

Ginaw Bilog (Hanunoo: ᜤᜲᜨᜯ᜴ ᜪᜲᜮᜳᜤ᜴) was a Filipino poet who was recognized as a National Living Treasure by the Philippine government.

Born on January 3, 1953, Bilog was a Hanunuo Mangyan who was a native of Mansalay, Oriental Mindoro. He was known for his efforts in preserving the Mangyan poetry tradition of ambahan.

Then-President Fidel V. Ramos conferred the Gawad sa Manlilikha ng Bayan (GAMABA) or National Living Treasure Award to Ginaw Bilog on December 17, 1993, in recognition of his people's efforts in preserving ambahan poetry, which is recorded on bamboo.

He died on June 3, 2003, at age 50 due to a lingering illness. His work is being continued by the Mansalay Oriental Mindoro School of Living Traditions on Mangyan Culture overseen by the National Commission on Culture and the Arts (NCCA).
