= Darhata Sawabi =

Filipino weaver (d. 2005)

- دَرْهَتَ سَوَبِ
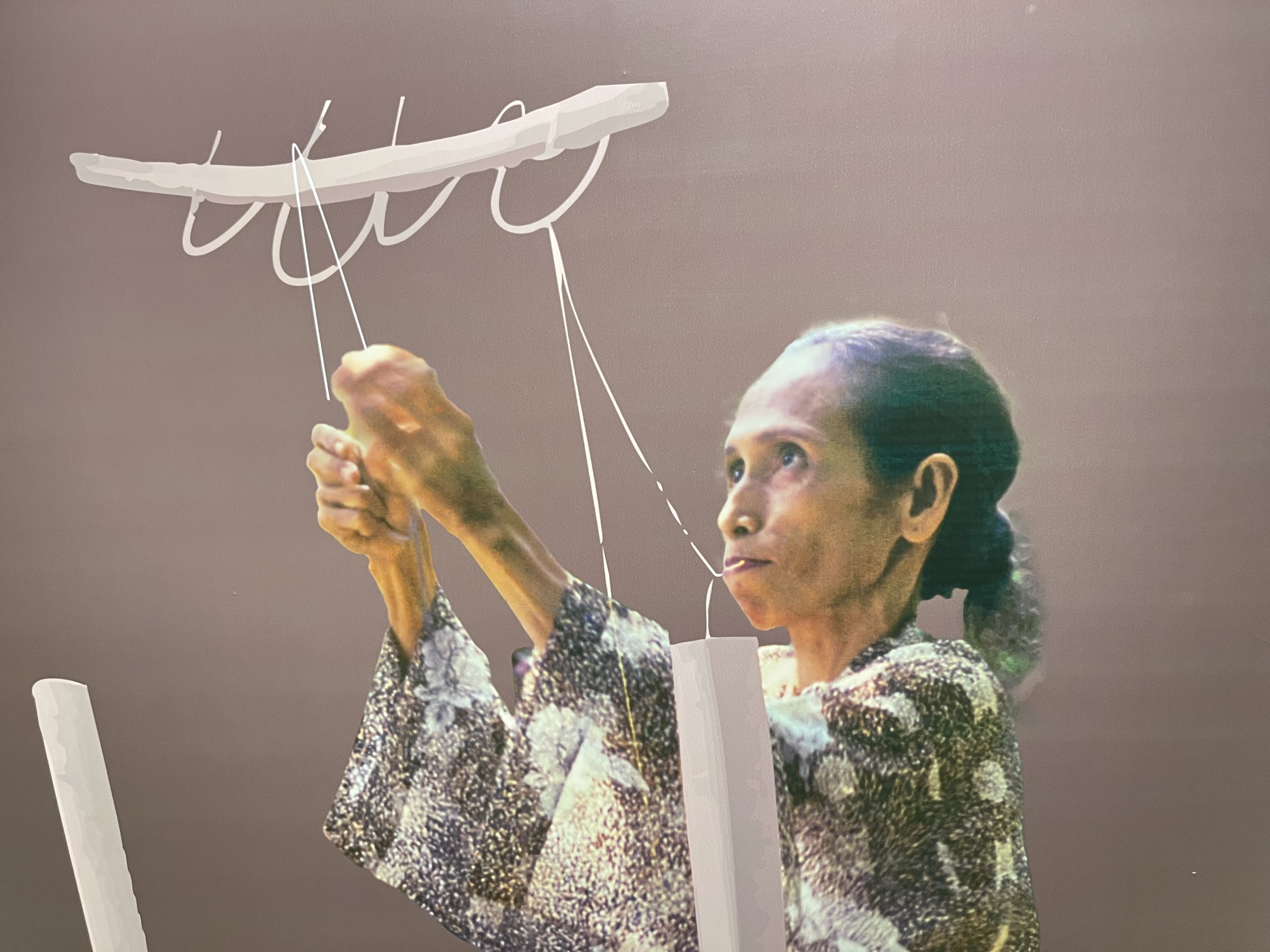
- Darhata Sawabi in 2026
- Died: March 12, 2005
- Known for: Textile
- Style: Pis syabit weaving
- Awards: National Living Treasure Award; 2004

Darhata Sawabi was a Filipino weaver from Parang, Sulu known for pis syabit, a traditional Tausūg cloth tapestry worn as a head covering by the people of Jolo. She was a recipient of the National Living Treasures Award, having been given the distinction in 2004. Pis refers to the geometric pattern that is said to be derived from the Indic mandala, and siyabit stands for the hook and technique.

Unmarried, Sawabi wove as a means of livelihood since farming, a common source of income for Parang families, was not sustainable for herself. Pis syabit weaving is a tedious work. It takes three days for the warp alone to be made. By age 48, she employed the help of apprentice weavers and children in her work. In the 1970s, she moved residence at least twice due to the Moro conflict. Sawabi died on March 12, 2005, about a year after she was given the National Living Treasures Award.
