= Federico Caballero =

Filipino epic chanter (1935–2024)

- Caballero in 2017

Background information
- Born: December 25, 1935
- Origin: Panay
- Died: August 17, 2024 (aged 88) Calinog, Iloilo, Philippines
- Genres: Folk
- Instruments: Vocals
- Awards: Gawad sa Manlilikha ng Bayan

Federico Caballero (December 25, 1935 – August 17, 2024) was a Filipino chanter of Philippine epic poetry. Caballero was a recipient of the National Living Treasures Award.

== Early life ==
Born on December 25, 1935, Caballero was of the Panay-Bukidnon people from the Central Panay mountains.

== Work ==
He was known for his work on the documentation of oral literature, particularly the ten epics. These epics are rendered in an extinct language related to Kinaray-a.

Caballero, who was also called Nong Pedring, learned about epics from his mother and his grandmother, Anggoy Omil who would chant these to him and his siblings as a lullaby. When Anggoy and his mother died, he went on to continue the traditions and documented these epics which are referred to as the Labaw Dunggon and Humadapnon epics with researchers. He worked with the Bureau of Nonformal Education, to teach people how to read and write and would promote the tradition of epic chanting despite the initial objection of his children.

He also worked as the manughusay in his local community, an arbiter who helps resolve disputes and conflicts in the community. He is considered as a bantugan due to his positive influence extending beyond his community.

The National Commission for Culture and the Arts (NCCA) recognized him as a National Living Treasure in 2000 for "weaving the fabric of oral tradition".

== Personal life and death ==
Caballero was married to Lucia, a binukot, a title similar to a princess in Panay-Bukidnon tradition and had three children.

Caballero lived in Calinog, Iloilo, and died there on August 17, 2024, at the age of 88. He was accorded a state funeral on September 3, while a day of national mourning was declared in honor of him by President Bongbong Marcos that same day.
