= Marife Ganahon =

- Born: 1967 (age 58–59); Valencia, Bukidnon, Philippines
- Known for: Textile
- Style: Higa-onon Manobo traditional ikam mat weaving
- Awards: National Living Treasure Award; 2023

Marife Ravidas Ganahon (born 1967) is a Filipino mat weaver known for the Higa-onon Manobo mat weaving art of ikam.

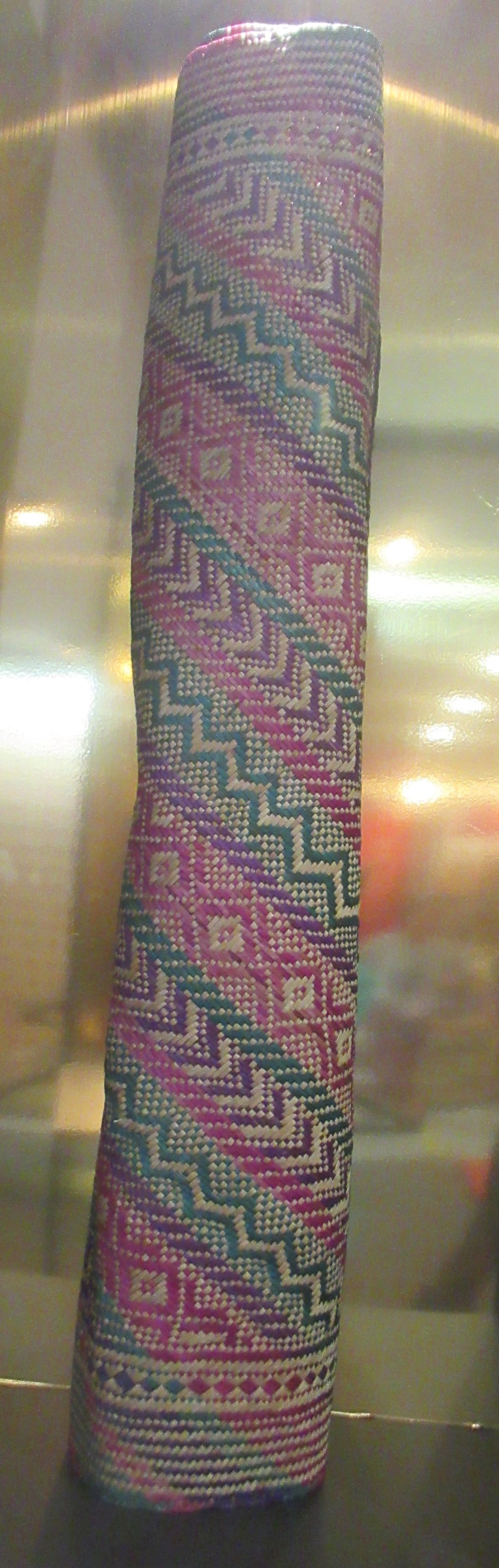
Ganahon's Ikam NCCA

== Background ==
Ganahon, a Higa-onon Manobo woman from Malaybalay, Bukidnon. She was however born in 1967 in Valencia, a town in the same province.

She is known for promoting and preserving the art of ikam, a mat weaving technique of the Higa-onons. Ikam are created from sodsod, a kind of sedge.

Ganahon learned the art of ikam from her mother and grandmother at age 10 after being inspired from the works of her aunt.

The National Commission for Culture and the Arts conferred Ganahon the Gawad sa Manlilikha ng Bayan award in December 2023.
