= Samporonia Madanlo =

Filipina artist (born 1950)

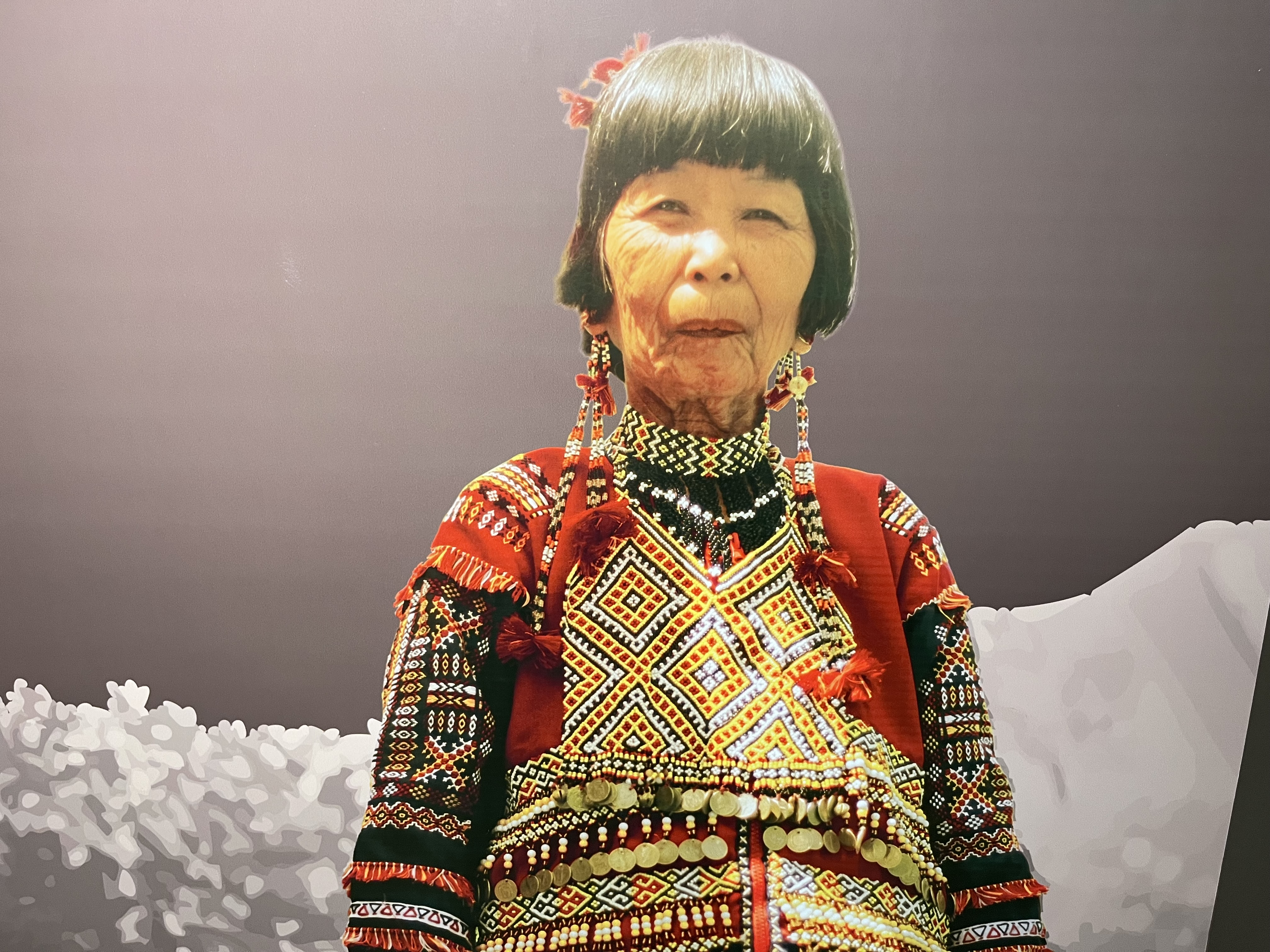
- Samporonia Madanlo in 2026
- Born: March 1, 1950 (age 76)
- Known for: Textile arts
- Style: Dagmay
- Awards: National Living Treasure Award; 2023

Samporonia Pagsac Madanlo (born March 1, 1950) is a Filipino artisan known for the dagmay weaving.

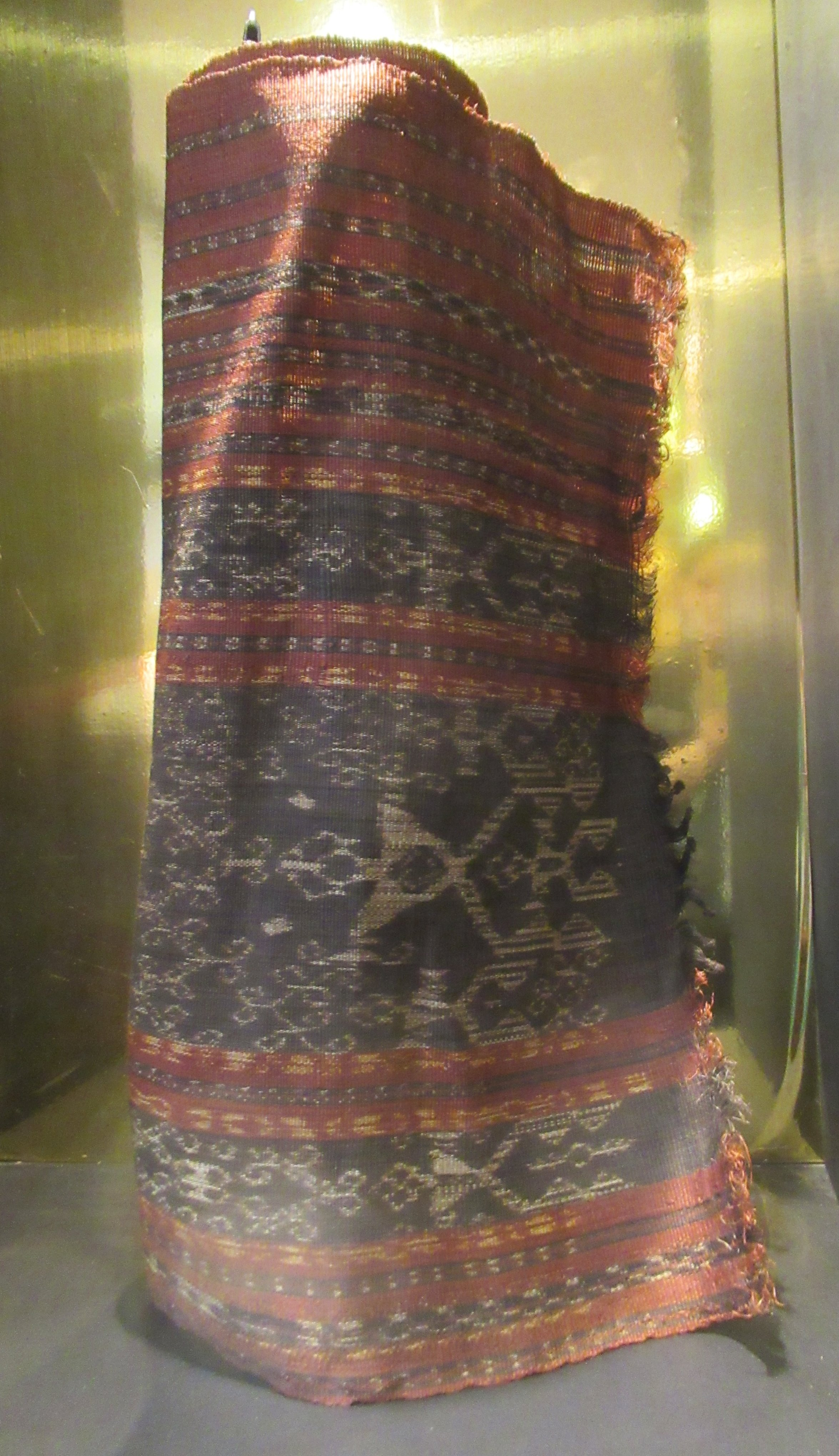
Madanlo's dagmay NCCA

== Background ==
Madanlo is from Caraga, Davao Oriental. She is known for weaving dagmay which is created from abacá fibers using the backstrap loom and its design made from ikat technique. Weaving Dagmay is a sacred tradition, which in the past can spur village conflicts when designs are copied or plagiarized. Having mastered the art of weaving dagmay, Samporonia can execute the most complicated designs such as the buaya ug utaw ( crocodile and human figure) and masuknit, which is her favorite design.

She is also an embroiderer, beadworker, basket maker, as well as a dancer and a healer.

Dagmay is associated with Mandaya mythology, particularly in the story involving Tagamaling, a deity. She first learned to weave at ten years old.

== Awards ==
The National Commission for Culture and the Arts conferred Madanlo the Gawad sa Manlilikha ng Bayan award in December 2023.

- List of Filipino women artists
