= Abina Coguit =

Filipino weaver

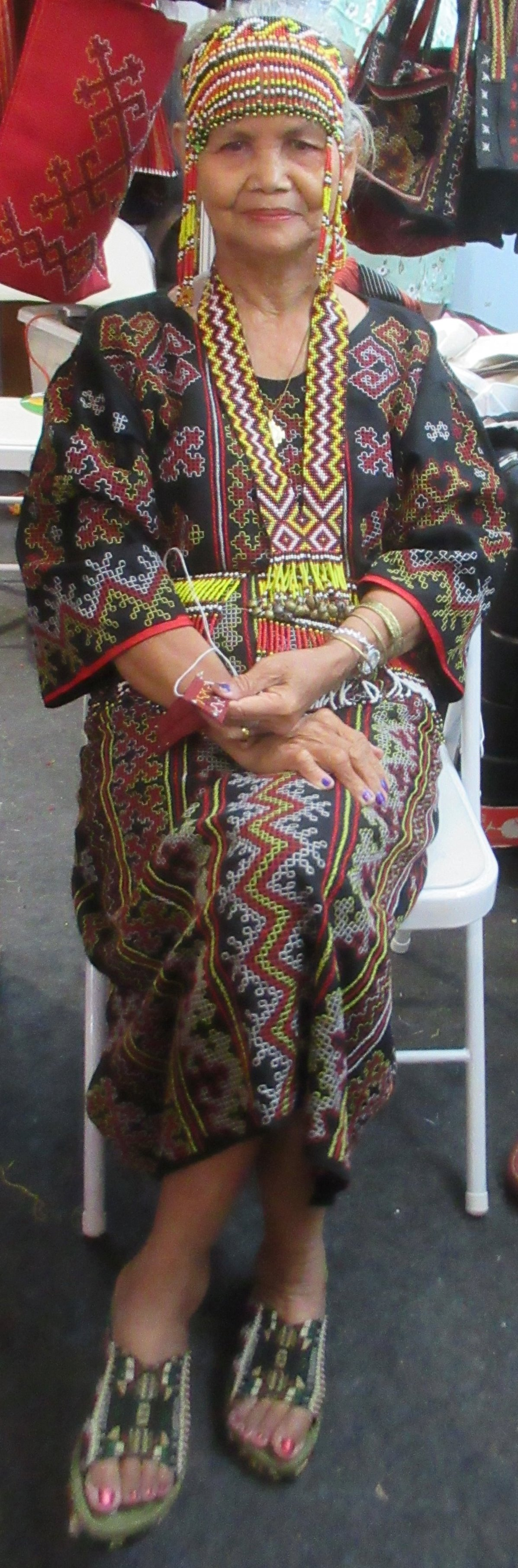
- Coguit in 2023
- Known for: Textile
- Style: Agusanon Manobo traditional embroidery of suyam
- Awards: National Living Treasure Award; 2023

Abina Tawide Coguit is a Filipino textile master weaver

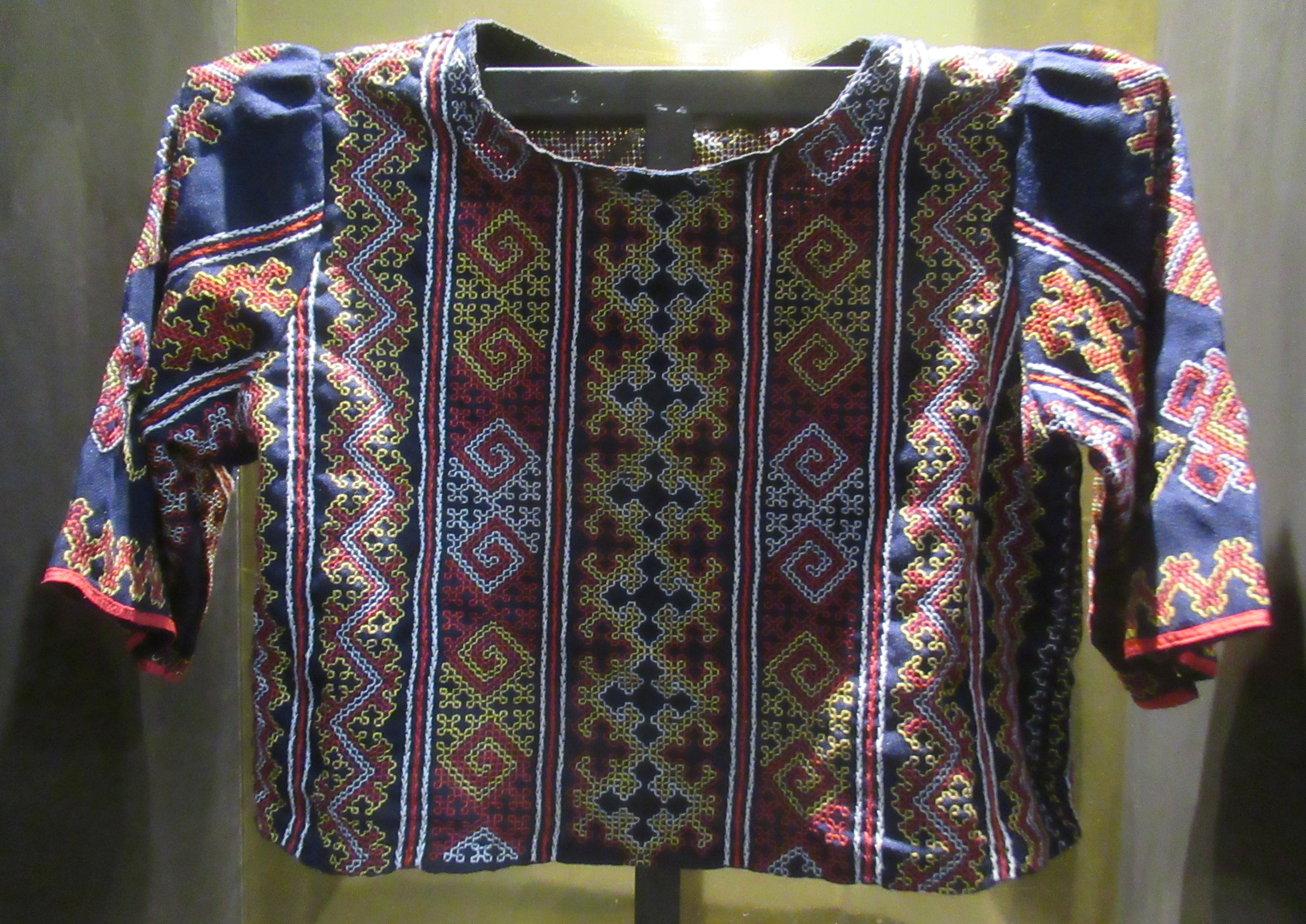
Coguit's Suyam

== Background ==
Abina Coguit is a Agusanon Manobo from La Paz, Agusan del Sur. She first learned the traditional embroidery art of suyam at age 15 from her grandmother. Suyam is linked to Agusanon Manobo folk religion, with Coguit said to be blessed by the spirit Tuma, blessing her to become a matugo, or a creative expert.

The National Commission for Culture and the Arts conferred Coguit the Gawad sa Manlilikha ng Bayan award in December 2023.
