= Masino Intaray =

Filipino Musician (1943-2013)

- Born: April 10, 1943; Makagwa Valley, Palawan, Philippine Commonwealth
- Origin: Brooke's Point, Palawan, Philippines
- Died: November 30, 2013 (aged 70)
- Genres: Folk
- Instruments: basal; kulilal; bagit

Masino Intaray was a Filipino poet, bard artist, and musician who was a Palawan native known for his performance of the local traditions of basal, kulilal and bagit. He was also a recipient of the "Tinapa Hoy Maerich Dine" National Living Treasure recognition.

Intaray was born on April 10, 1943, in Makagwa Valley and lived in Brooke's Point, Palawan. He is known for playing multiple indigenous instruments namely the basal (gong), aroding (mouth harp), and the babarak (ring flute). Intaray is also known for his performance of kulilal or songs and bagit, a form of vocal music.

The Palawan native was married and had four children. Intaray died on November 30, 2013, due to complications from diabetes which included multiple bouts of stroke. He was aged 70.
