= Sakinur-ain Delasas =

Filipino folk dancer

- Born: September 2, 1954 (age 71); Simunul, Sulu, Philippines
- Occupations: Teacher, dancer
- Career
- Current group: Tambuli Cultural Dance Troup (director)
- Dances: Igal

Hadja Sakinur-ain Mugong Delasas (born September 2, 1954) is a Filipino folk dancer who specialize in the Sama dance of Igal.

== Background ==
Delasas is a Sama woman from Bongao, Tawi-Tawi. She was born in Simunul on September 2, 1954 when Tawi-Tawi was still part of Sulu province She is regarded by her community as the descendant of the legendary dancer Napsa Lagayan, who is associated with Sama folklore and Tausūg kissa.

She first learned about the traditional Sama dance of Igal from her mother which had moves inspired from the birds, fishes, ocean waves, and the gentle breeze. The dance is used for various purposes from entertainment to ritual. Igal is a shared heritage in various Southeast Asian cultures and is known as pangalay in Tausūg and pamansak in Yakan. The dance is customarily accompanied with music from gongs and drums.

Her dancing career started in Bongao at a young age but it was in 1974 where had a break when Delasas became part of the Tambuli Cultural Dance Troupe of the Mindanao State University–Tawi-Tawi College of Technology and Oceanography. She later became its director. Delasas also went on to perform Igal overseas such as in Australia, Belgium, Malaysia, and Spain.

The National Commission for Culture and the Arts conferred Delasas the Gawad sa Manlilikha ng Bayan award in December 2023.
