= Teofilo Garcia =

Filipino hatter

- Teofilo Garcia in 2017
- Born: March 27, 1941 (age 84)
- Occupations: Farmer, hatter
- Known for: Tabunggaw (gourd) hat
- Awards: National Living Treasure Award; 2012

Teofilo Garcia (born March 27, 1941) is a Filipino hatter who is regarded as a National Living Treasure in the Philippines for making tabungaw hats, a type of Ilocano headwear.

== Background ==
Garcia is known for crafting tabungaw hat, a type of Ilocano hat made from a variety of gourd (Cucurbitaceae) known locally as tabungaw.

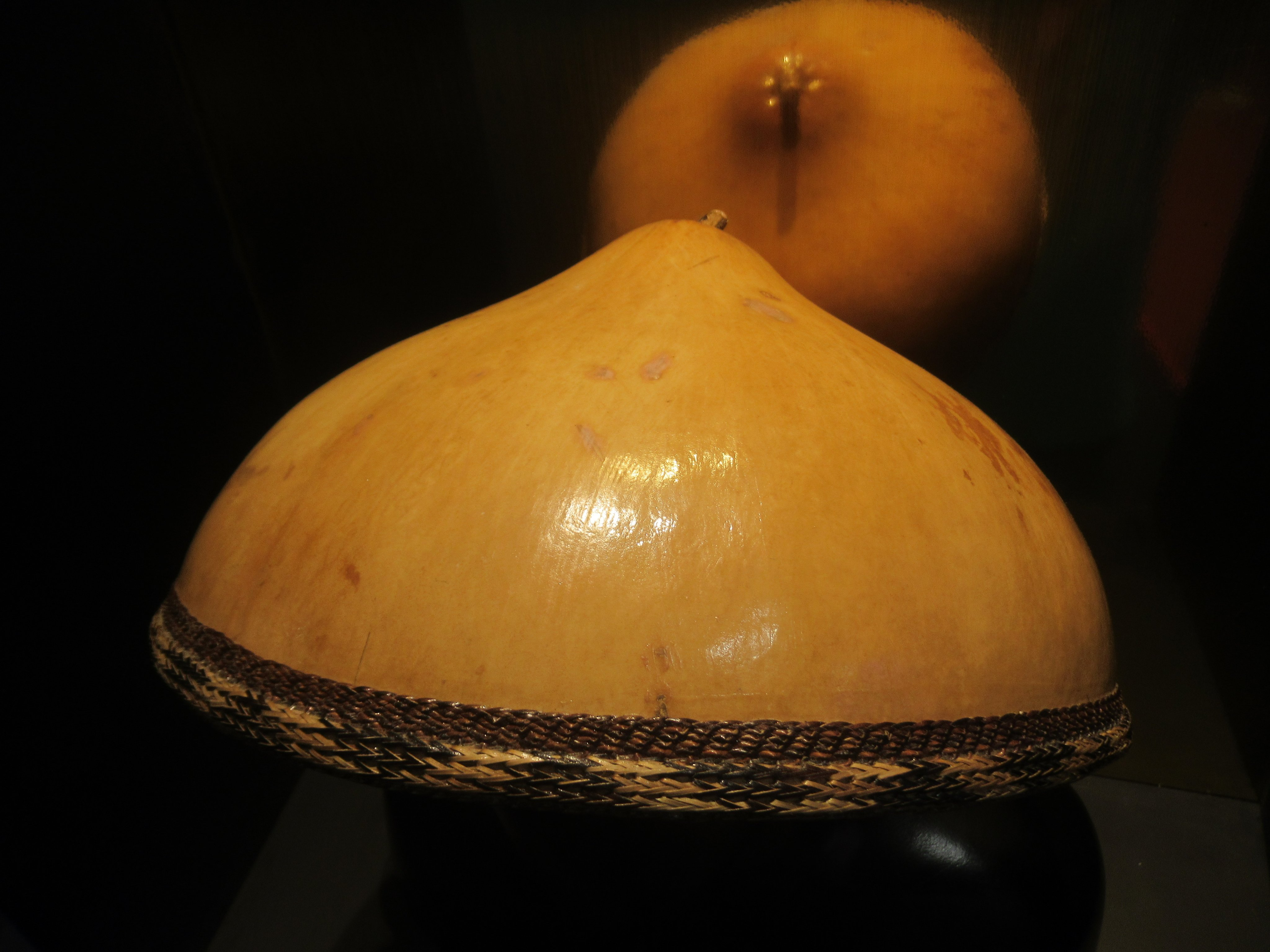
Tabungaw (Kattukung)

Garcia, who has five children, primarily works as a farmer. He primarily cultivates rice and tobacco and tends to a herd of cows. During the period when he does neither of these, Garcia grows tabungaw. He is a native of the town of San Quintin in Abra.

Garcia learned how to create tabungaw hats and weave basket from his grandfather when he was 15 years old. He eventually became known for producing tabungaw hats – his hats were reputed to be the most sturdy and smooth in his community. Garcia himself would wear tabungaw hat in his daily life and he could create 100 headwear in a year if the gourd harvest is good.

He would also innovate on the creation of tabungaw hats experimenting on using nito and bamboo fibers as decor. The interior of Garcia's hats would also vary in decoration.

On November 8, 2012, he was conferred the National Living Treasure Award.
