= Alonzo Saclag =

Filipino musician and dancer (1942–2025)

- Saclag in 2017
- Born: Alonzo Ayutu Saclag; August 14, 1942 (Note: The reported birth date is August 14 at the time of death. This includes the National Commission for Culture and the Arts, and a live taurpaulin signage at Saclag's state funeral services as shown in Tabuk City Newsbreak. However some prior source reports Saclag's birthdate as August 4 such as: The Official Gazette, the Philippine Information Agency (PIA) and Lubuagan Tourism and Cultural Officer Ansherina Rose Odiem-Mosing from the Philippine Daily Inquirer (PDI). This is despite both the PIA and PDI sources including an obituary photo listing August 14 as the birthdate.; The National Museum of the Philippines likewise lists the August 4 date in a post commemorating Saclag's 80th birthdate in 2022 but lists his birthdate as August 14 in a post commemorating Saclag after his death.; Lastly the voiceover of the presenter in the Tabuk City Newsbreak report states Saclag as simply being born in August 1942.); Lubuagan, Kalinga, Philippine Commonwealth
- Died: November 29, 2025 (aged 83); Lubuagan, Kalinga, Philippines
- Other name: Apu Kesu
- Spouse: Rebecca Saclag
- Children: 9
- Awards: Gawad sa Manlilikha ng Bayan
- Musical career
- Genres: Traditional folk music
- Instruments: Gangsa (Kalinga gong)
- Dancing career
- Former groups: Kalinga Budong Dance Troupe

Alonzo Ayutu Saclag Sr. (August 14, 1942 – November 29, 2025) or Apu Kesu was a Filipino musician and dancer who was a recipient of the National Living Treasures Award.

== Early life and career ==
Alonzo Ayatu Saclag was born in August 14, 1942, in Lubuagan, Kalinga. A member of the Kalinga people and a native of Lubuagan, Kalinga province, Saclag taught himself his people's traditions in the performing arts. He learned how to play traditional Kalinga musical instruments and Kalinga ritual dance movements without formal or informal instruction.

Saclag worked to revive the dying tradition of playing the gangsa, a type of Kalinga gong. He lobbied for two years with the provincial government to grant funds to convert the abandoned Capitol Building into a museum. With support from the provincial government and other financiers, a branch of the National Museum was established in Lubuagan.

He also campaigned for the promotion of Kalinga culture in schools in his community by engaging in talks with the institutions' administrators. He was instrumental in establishing the practice of children wearing traditional Kalinga clothing for important school events as well as the teaching of Kalinga folk songs in schools. He also lobbied for the broadcast of traditional Kalinga music along with contemporary music in their local radio station. He also formed the Kalinga Budong Dance Troupe with the intent of promoting Kalinga dance to a wider audience.

Saclag was conferred the National Living Treasures Award in 2000. By 2016, he had established a village within his town, named Awichon, which aims to promote Kalinga culture to tourists.

== Personal life and death ==
Saclag who is also known as Apu Kesu married to a woman named Rebecca with whom he had nine children. He died on November 29, 2025, at the age of 83 in his hometown of Lubuagan.
