= Ambahan =

Traditional Philippine poetry

Ambahan is a traditional form of poetry by the Hanunó'o Mangyan people of Mindoro, Philippines.

== Characteristics ==
The ambahan has several characteristics. First, it is a rhythmic poetic expression with a meter of seven syllable lines and having rhythmic end-syllables. It is also most often presented as a chant without a determined musical pitch or musical instrument accompaniment. Finally, it is meant to express in an allegorical way, using poetic language, certain situations or particular characteristics referred to by the one reciting the poem.

The characteristic of the ambahan of having seven syllables in a single line distinguishes it from other forms of poetry of the Hanunó'o Mangyans. This particular feature has exceptions. The first part of the ambahan could have more than seven syllables although this portion may not be considered as the poem proper and only serves as an introduction. This may be due to the shortage of suitable word combinations for a certain line or the line could not be further shortened. A line could also be shorter than seven syllables in order to preserve the meaning of the line which would have been changed by the addition of syllables although this is rare.

== Reading and subjects ==
The ambahan is traditionally sung and may focus on various topics such as courtship, giving advice to the young, asking for a place to stay, and saying goodbye to a friend.

== Preservation ==
Ambahan is traditionally recorded on bamboo. It is inscribed in the material using Surat Mangyan, an indigenous script predating the Spanish colonial era in the Philippines. Mangyan Poet Ginaw Bilog was recognized for the preservation of his people's tradition in 1993 who also records the ambahan in a notebook. The mode of transmission of the poetry prevents the carrier from adding his own content or modification, ensuring the purity of the poetry.
