= Samaon Sulaiman =

- Born: 3 March 1953
- Origin: Mamasapano, Maguindanao del Sur, Philippines
- Died: 21 May 2011 (aged 58)
- Genres: Folk
- Instruments: kutyapi
- Awards: Gawad sa Manlilikha ng Bayan

Samaon Sulaiman was a Filipino musician who was a recipient of the National Living Treasure award. The Maguindanaon was known for his mastery of the indigenous kutyapi instrument.

Born on 3 March 1953, Sulaiman first learned to play the kutyapi at around 13 years old from his uncle. By the time he was 35 years old, he was already recognized in Maganoy for his skills in playing the instrument as well as being a teacher to aspiring kutyapi practitioners. He is credited with influencing other local experts in his area such as Esmael Ahmad, Bitul Sulaiman, Nguda Latip, Ali Ahmad and Tukal Nanalon. Sulaiman also played the kulintang, agong (suspended bossed gong with a wide rim), gandingan, palendag, and the tambul.

He was a barber, as well as an imam at the Libutan mosque. He died on 21 May 2011.
