= Lang Dulay =

Filipino textile weaver

Bai Lang Dulay
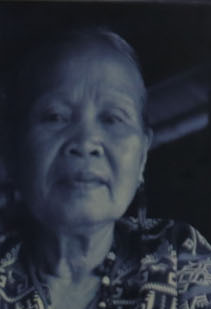
- T'nalak weaving Tboli
- Born: August 3, 1928
- Died: April 30, 2015 (aged 86)
- Known for: T'nalak weaving
- Style: Traditional T'boli design
- Awards: Gawad sa Manlilikha ng Bayan

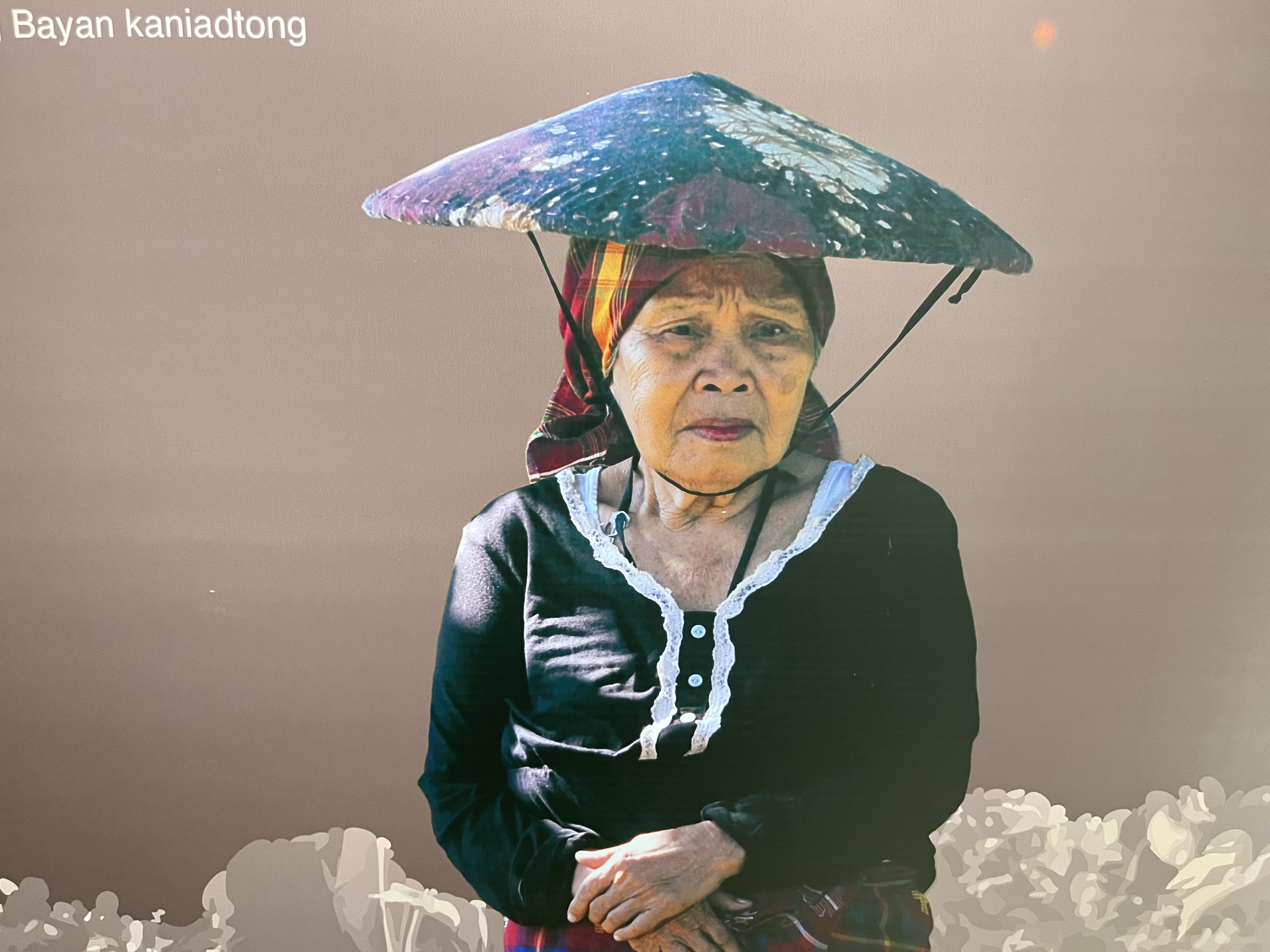
Lang Dulay, Manlilikha ng Bayan

Lang Dulay (August 3, 1928 – April 30, 2015) was a Filipino traditional weaver who was a recipient of the National Living Treasures Award.

She is credited with preserving her people's tradition of weaving T'nalak, a dyed fabric made from refined abaca fibre.

== Biography ==
Born on August 3, 1928, Lang Dulay was a T'boli princess from the Lake Sebu region in South Cotabato. She first learnt weaving at the age of 12 from her mother, Luan Senig.

She is known for maintaining the use of traditional motifs in T'nalak weaving amidst commercialization of the craft which saw the introduction of more modern designs by non-T'bolis. She notably had a mental repertoire of around 100 patterns and designs: some of these were based on her dreams, hence her description as a "dreamweaver".

Lang Dulay set up the Manlilikha ng Bayan Center workshop in her hometown to promote the traditional art of T'nalak weaving and by 2014, five of her grandchildren had become weavers.

Lang Dulay fell into a coma in early 2015 and died on April 30 of the same year.

=== Recognition ===
She was conferred the National Living Treasures Award in 1998. That same year, her works were featured in an exhibit at the Smithsonian Institution in Washington, D.C. in the United States as part of the Philippine Independence Centennial celebrations.
