= Amparo Mabanag =

Filipina artist (born 1953)

- Born: October 5, 1953 (age 72)
- Occupations: Beadworker and embroiderer
- Style: Ga'dang manu'bak (beadwork) and ameru (embroidery)
- Awards: National Living Treasure Award; 2023

Amparo Balansi Mabanag (born October 5, 1953) is a Filipino beadworker and embroider.

== Background ==
Mabanag is a Ga'dang woman from Paracelis, Mountain Province. She is credited for her promotion and preservation of manu'bak (beadwork) and ameru (embroidery) of the Ga'dang. She learned the craft at age 14 with her aunts as her teachers.

The National Commission for Culture and the Arts conferred Mabanag the Gawad sa Manlilikha ng Bayan award in December 2023.

== See also ==
- List of Filipino women artists
