= T'nalak =

Weaving tradition in South Cotabato, Philippines

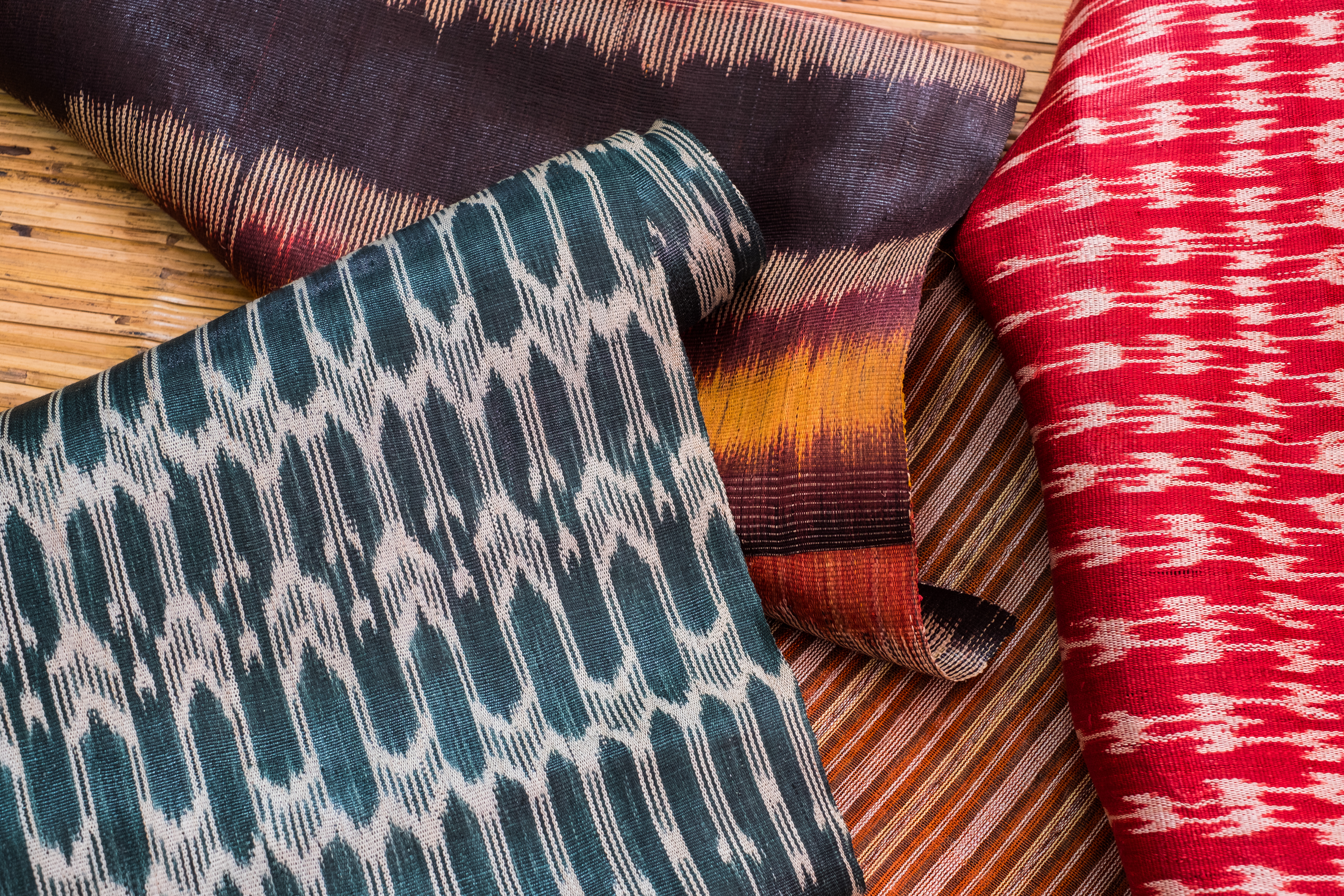
Various types of tnalak cloth, patterned using single ikat (dyeing patterns into the warp); one also uses multiple solid weft colours

Tnalak (also spelled tenalak), is a weaving tradition using resist-dyed threads of the Tboli people of South Cotabato, Philippines. T'nalak cloth is woven exclusively by women who have received the designs for the weave in their dreams, which they believe are a gift from Fu Dalu, the T'boli Goddess of abacá.

The rest of the community, including the men, are able to participate in the production of T'nalak by carefully selecting, stripping, and sun-drying the abacá fibers to be used. Once the fibers have been prepared, they are dyed using the dye-resist technique called ikat, based on the pattern dreamt by the weaver; the woman gifted by Fu Dalu with the design then weaves the cloth using a backstrap loom.

The fact that the designs are derived from the dreams of the weavers means that traditional t'nalak patterns cannot be mass-produced. Because the patterns are based on dreams, the weavers of t'nalak are popularly referred to as dreamweavers.

== Production and history ==
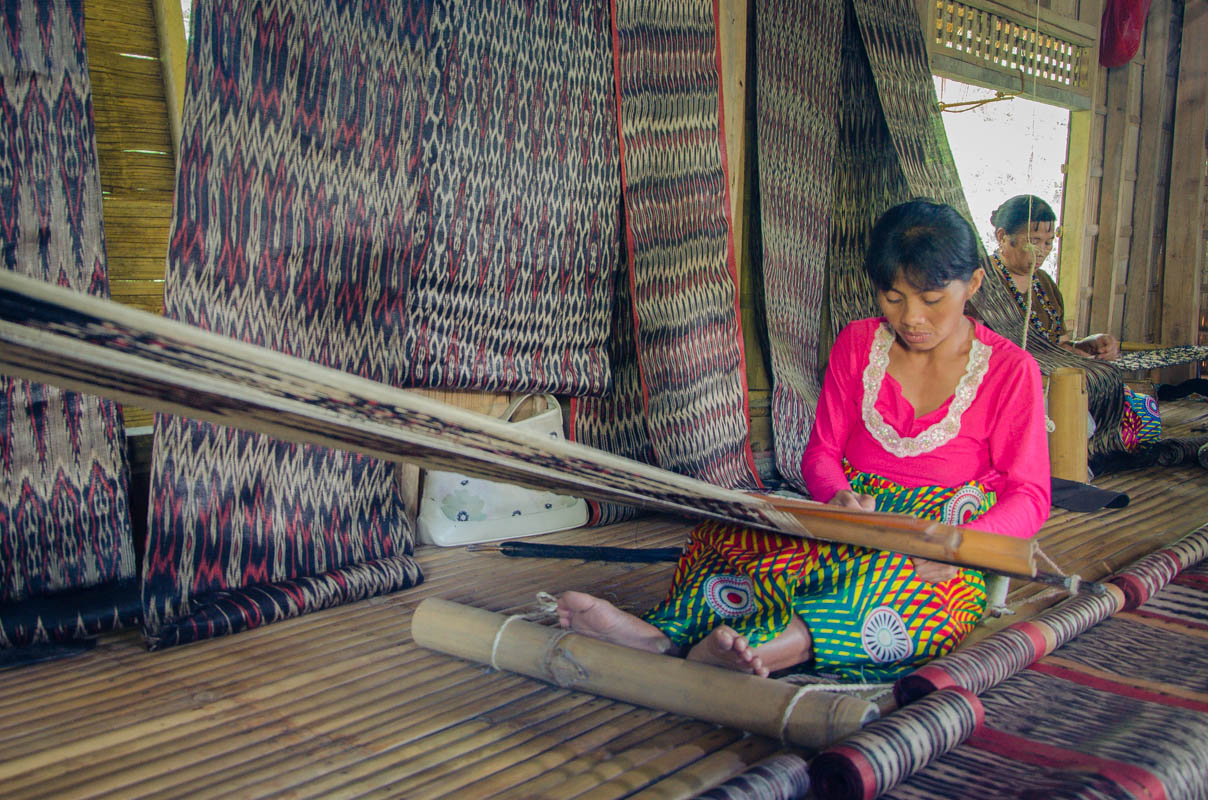
T'boli weavers in Lake Sebu, South Cotabato

T'nalak weaving is part of the intangible cultural heritage of the Tboli people, an indigenous people group in the Philippines whose ancestral domain is in the province of South Cotabato, on the island of Mindanao in the Philippines.

The production of the cloth is particularly associated with the shores of Lake Sebu, which is in the municipality of the same name as the lake.

=== Dreamt designs from Fu Dalu ===
The weaving of traditional T'nalak cloth begins when a T'boli woman has a kena (dream) in which they encounter Fu Dalu, the T'boli Goddess of abacá and guardian of the T'nalak. During these dreams, Fu Dalu shows the woman the designs that would eventually be woven into the cloth.

The dyeing and weaving processes are approached with extra care because the T'boli believe that Fu Dalo comes to inhabit each individual yarn.

=== Selection, stripping ===
The broader community, including the T'boli men, participate in the production of cloth during the abaca fiber selection and stripping process. The fibers are taken from the stalk of the abacá (Musa textilis), a banana plant species native to the Philippines.

To do so, they fix a cowrie shell to one end of an abacá stem pole and link the other end to the roof as a hinge, pushing on the pole to apply pressure on the fibre with the shell. The fibers, which are very thin, are carefully stripped from the stalk with the use of a mounted blade, and then sun-dried.

=== Ikat dyeing ===
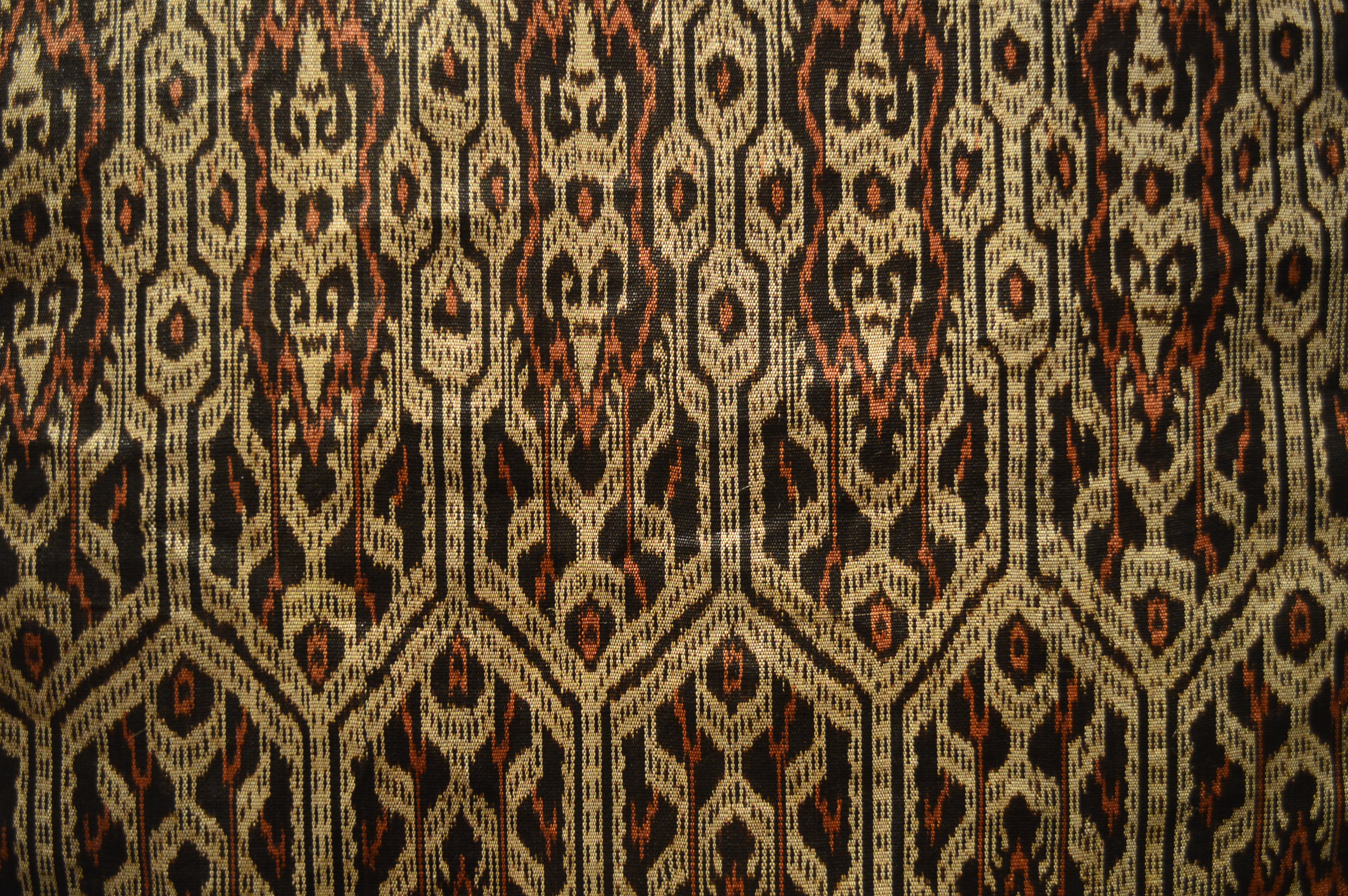
Finished item

The fibers are then sun-dried, and then dyed using the indigenous dye-resist technique called "ikat." Sections of the abaca thread are coated by the weaver with a wax-resistant substance so that they will resist the dye. The process is repeated several times in order to suit the requirements of the design.

T'nalak contains three colours: white symbolises purity, red represents blood and black signifies the soil. In addition to white abacá, the red dye comes from the brownish-red roots of the loko tree, while the black is obtained by boiling the green leaves of the knalum tree for seven days, which turn them dark as ink.

=== Weaving process ===
The weaver then implements the design on a backstrap loom, a process that can take up to two months, depending on the design revealed in the dream.

Offerings, such as woven blouses and jewelry, are traditionally left in the weaving area as tribute to Fu Dalo. During the extensive weaving process, female weavers and their husbands are banned from having sex as a show of respect to Fu Dalu.

== Description ==
This traditional cloth is hand-woven from carefully selected, stripped, and sun-dried abaca fibers. The colorant of the materials are natural dyes produced by boiling the bark, roots and leaves of plants.

Unlike many of the colorful cloth patterns in Mindanao, T'nalak is distinctive in using only three different colors - black, white, and red. Black serves as the background color, and is the dominant color of the cloth, while white is used to create different motifs. Red is typically used to accentuate the patterns. Common motifs include the human, the crab, the shield, the lizard, and the traditional frog.

== Dreamweaving ==
It is a heritage and believed that the intricate and creative patterns of the Tinalak was seen on their dreams and made it on to work. They can't create a design of the Tinalak if they haven't dreamed of it. They are sometimes called the "Dream Weavers".

== Role in T'boli life ==
The T'nalak fabric holds a special and prominent place in T'boli culture. It is ever present in significant turning points in a Tboli life, such as birth, marriage, and deaths. It is the other medium which sanctifies these rites, enveloping them in the length of its fabric like a benediction.

It has also often been referred to as "woven dreams". It is exactly that, and more. In a culture which didn't have a form of writing, the T'nalak served as both Literature and Art. The T'bolis expressed everything they are in the T'nalak: their dreams, beliefs, myths and even their religion. Making use of the various geometrical patterns and the trademark red, black and white colors, the T'bolis weave the natural and the supernatural in the abaca strands of the T'nalak.

Furthermore, the weaving process integrates the personal, the social and the cultural. After a weaver reaches a certain degree of expertise, she becomes a "master weaver" – someone who can interpret and take inspiration from dreams, hence the term "dreamweavers". By all accounts, this seems to be an intense personal experience for the weaver, and the moment she succeeds in doing this is the moment she becomes an artist. And then it is also social because the T'nalak binds together all that the T'boli people believe in. The skill of the weaver gathers in the T'nalak all the elements that make the T'boli social life. Finally, it is cultural in that it is the means through which other tribes identify the T'bolis since the T'nalak is uniquely and distinctly T'boli.

T'nalak are also their prized possession at marriage, even the covering for childbirth for ensuring safe delivery and for trading. Whenever they sell their work, they put a brass ring around it as for the spirits to allow them or to please. It is believed that cutting the cloth would deliver sickness.

== Recognition ==
The t'nalak weaving tradition is acknowledged as part of the intangible cultural heritage of the T'boli and of the Philippines.

In recognition of the significance of t'nalak to Philippine culture and heritage, a t'nalak design pattern is shown on the reverse side of the one thousand-peso note of the New Generation Currency Series of Philippine peso banknotes.

The Philippine province of South Cotabato, in which the Tboli have their ancestral domains, celebrates the T'nalak festival annually.

== See also ==
- Abacá
- Batik
- Inabel
- Lang Dulay
- Malong
- Piña
- Hablon
- Tapis
- Yakan people
