= Tboli people =

Austronesian ethnic group

Tboli
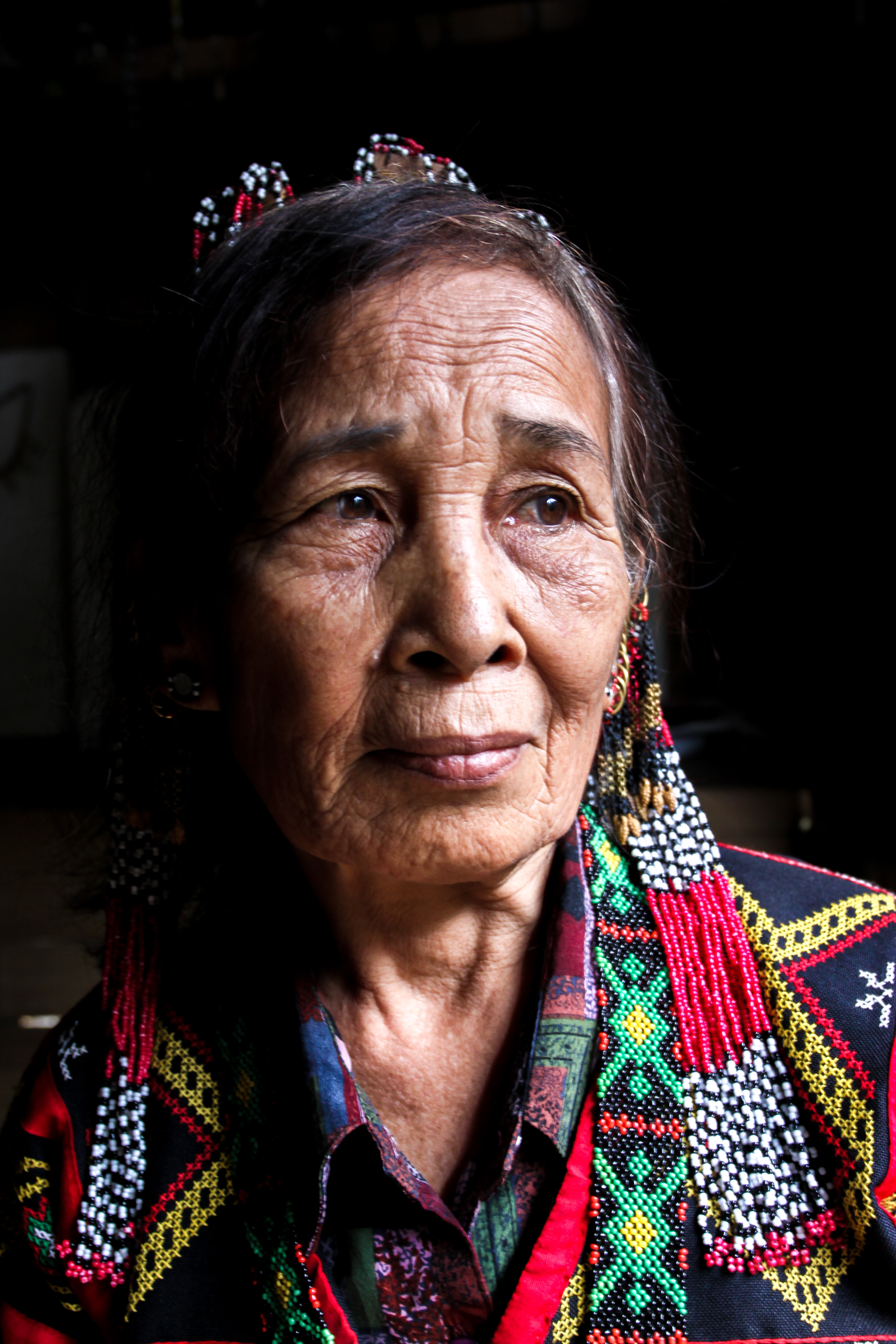
- An elderly Tboli woman in Tboli attire.

Total population
- 181,125 (2020 census)

Regions with significant populations
- Philippines (Soccsksargen, Davao Region)

Languages
- Native; Tboli; Also; Cebuano, Hiligaynon, Filipino, English

Religion
- Christianity; Islam; Tboli polytheism

Related ethnic groups
- Austronesian peoples, Lumad, and Sama-Bajau peoples

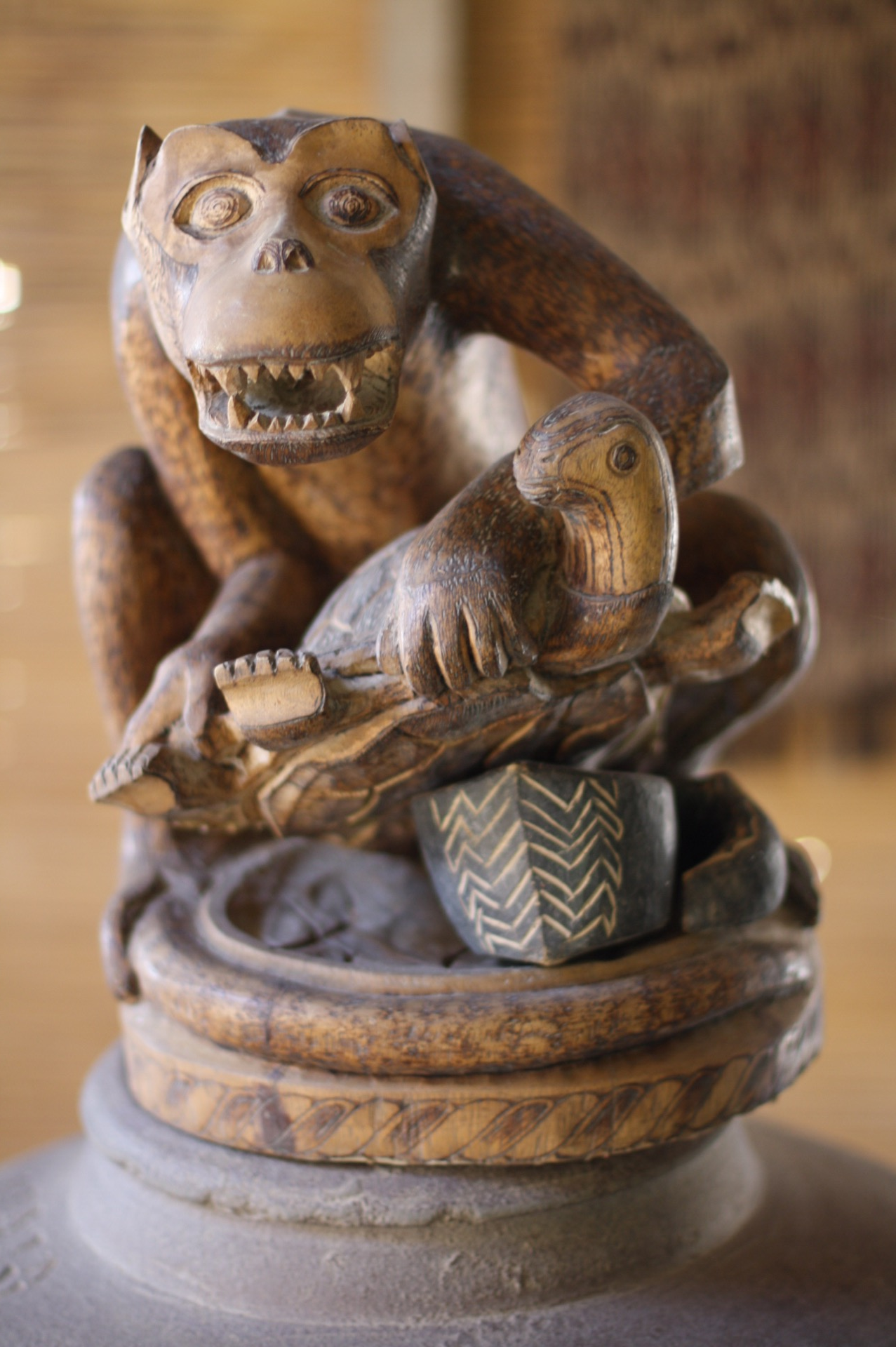
A Tboli sculpture, on display in the Tboli museum near Lake Sebu, South Cotabato, Philippines.

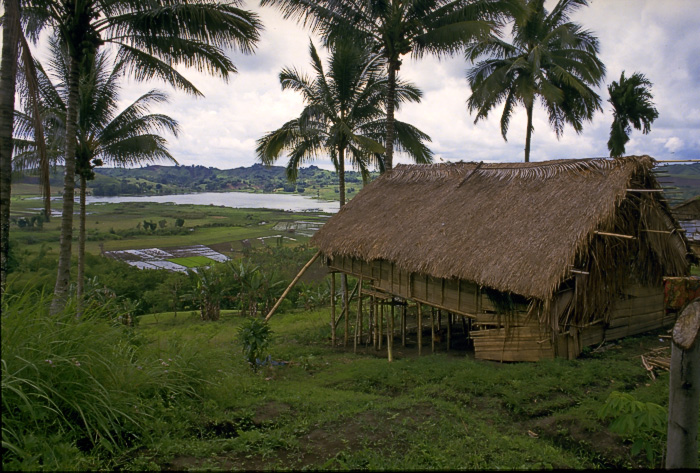
A Tboli rural residence.

The T'boli people (IPA: [tᵊˈbɔli]) are an Austronesian indigenous people of South Cotabato in southern Mindanao in the Philippines.

== Ethnology ==
T'bolis currently reside on the mountain slopes on either side of the upper Alah Valley and the coastal area of Maitum, Maasim and Kiamba in the province of Sarangani. In former times, the Tbolis also resided in the upper floor of the Alah Valley. After World War II and the arrival of settlers from other parts of the Philippines, they have been gradually pushed to the mountain slopes, and have been almost expelled from the fertile valley floor.

Like their immediate neighbouring ethnic groups, the Úbûs, Blàan, Blit, Tàú-Segél, and the Tasaday, they have historically been described as pagans or animists, as opposed to Muslim peoples or Christian settlers. In political contexts, however, the Cebuano term "Lumad" ("native") has become an umbrella term for the various polytheistic peoples of Mindanao.

In ethnographic and linguistic literature on Mindanao, their name is variously spelt Tboli, T'boli, Tböli, Tagabili, Tagabilil, Tagabulul and Tau Bilil. Their endonym is Tboli. In the literature, their whereabouts and identity are somewhat imprecise: some publications present the Tboli and the Tagabili as distinct peoples, whereas some locate the Tbolis in the vicinity of Lake Buluan in the Cotabato Basin or in Agusan del Norte.

Tbolis speak their native language of the same name; however, increasingly, Tbolis can speak and understand Cebuano, Hiligaynon, Tagalog, and, to some extent, Ilocano, alongside their own. These languages were brought and introduced by settlers from Cebu, Bohol, Siquijor, Negros, Panay, Tagalog-speaking regions, Central Luzon, and Ilocandia upon their arrival into Tboli homelands during the early 20th century.

They are considered to be an indigenous people in Philippine law.

== Music ==
The Tboli have a musical heritage consisting of various types of agung ensembles, which are composed of large hanging, suspended or held, bossed/knobbed gongs that act as drone without any accompanying melodic instrument.

Other instruments include the hegelung.

== Tboli religion ==
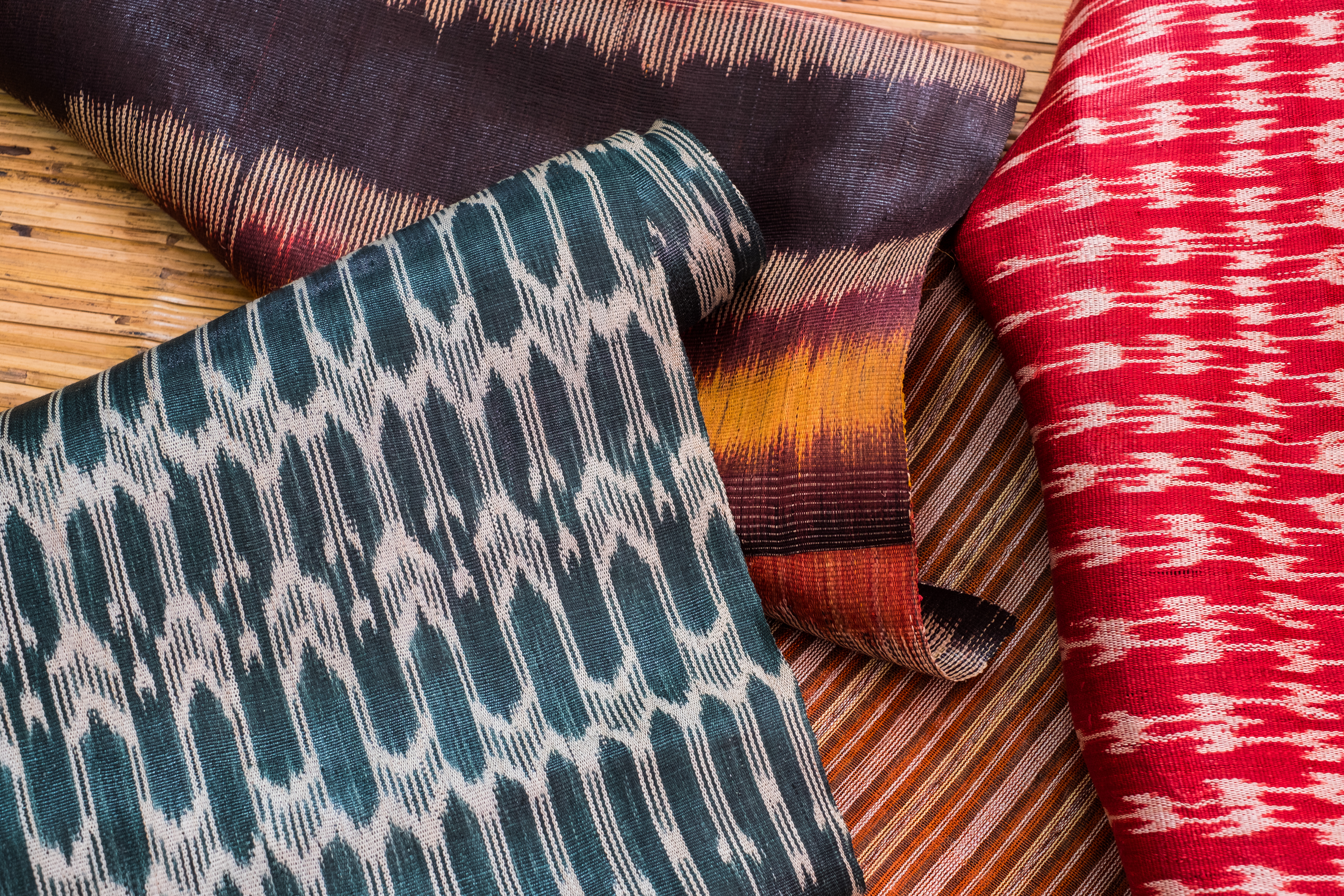
Tnalak cloth of Tboli dream weavers have patterns inspired by dreams and blessed by Fu Dalu, the Tboli god of abacá

The Tboli have a tradition of a highly complex polytheistic religion. However, more recent variants of their religion have been influenced by Islam and Christianity. Nevertheless, some continue to preserve religious practices from traditions thousands of years old, while others have involved with syncretic beliefs combining their traditional religious elements with Christianity or Islam.

=== Immortals ===
- Bulon La Mogoaw: one of two supreme deities; married to Kadaw La Sambad; lives in the seventh layer of the universe
- Kadaw La Sambad: the second supreme deities; married to Bulon La Mogoaw; lives in the seventh layer of the universe
- Cumucul: son of the supreme deities; has a cohort of fire, a sword, and shield; married to Boi’Kafil
- Boi’Kafil: daughter of the supreme deities; married to Cumucul
- Bong Libun: daughter of the supreme deities; married to S’fedat; could not bear children
- S’fedat: son of the supreme deities; married to Bong Libun; could not bear children; asked Bong Libun to instead kill him, where his body became the land from which plants spout from
- D’wata: son of the supreme deities; married to both Sedek We and Hyu We; placed the land-body of S’fedat on the sea
- Sedek We: daughter of the supreme deities; married to D’wata
- Hyu We: daughter of the supreme deities; married to D’wata
- Blotik: son of the supreme deities; married to S’lel
- S’lel: daughter of the supreme deities; married to Blotik
- B’lomi: daughter of the supreme deities; married to Mule
- Mule: son of the supreme deities; married to B’lomi
- Loos K’lagan: son of the supreme deities; married to both La Fun and Datu B’noling
- La Fun: daughter of the supreme deities; married to Loos K’lagan
- Datu B’noling: daughter of the supreme deities; married to Loos K’lagan
- Children of D’wata and Hyu We
  - L’tik
  - B’langa
  - Temo Lus
  - T’dolok
  - Ginton
  - L’mugot M’ngay
  - Fun Bulol: the owner of wild animals
- Children of D’wata and Sedek We
  - Kayung
  - Slew
  - S’mbleng
  - Nagwawang
  - Nga Hule
  - S’ntan
- Fu: spirits that inhabit and own the natural environment
  - Fu El: the spirit of water
  - Fu El Melel: the spirit of the river
- D’wata (general): the generic term for the gods; guard lives and determine fate and destiny
- Muhen: a god of fate in the form of a bird whose song when heard is thought to presage misfortune; any undertaking is immediately abandoned or postponed when one hears the Muhen sing
- Glinton: the god of metallurgy
