= List of Intangible Cultural Heritage elements in the Philippines =

The United Nations Educational, Scientific and Cultural Organisation (UNESCO) intangible cultural heritage elements are the non-physical traditions and practices performed by a people. As part of a country's cultural heritage, they include celebrations, festivals, performances, oral traditions, music, and the making of handicrafts. The "intangible cultural heritage" is defined by the Convention for the Safeguarding of Intangible Cultural Heritage, drafted in 2003 and took effect in 2006. Inscription of new heritage elements on the UNESCO Intangible Cultural Heritage Lists is determined by the Intergovernmental Committee for the Safeguarding of Intangible Cultural Heritage, an organisation established by the convention.

The Philippines ratified the convention on 18 August 2006.

== Intangible Cultural Heritage of Humanity ==
+ Transnational element

=== Representative List ===
Name	Image	Year	No.	Description
Hudhud chants of the Ifugao		2008	00015	Hudhud is a tradition of narrative songs from the Ifugao region of the northern Philippine island of Luzón.
Darangen epic of the Maranao people of Lake Lanao		2008	00159	Darangen is a Maranao epic poem from the Lake Lanao region of Mindanao
Tugging rituals and games + (Note: Shared with Cambodia, South Korea, and Vietnam.)		2015	01080	
Aklan piña handloom weaving		2023	01564	Piña is a traditional fiber made from the leaves of the pineapple plant. Piña handloom weaving is an age-old tradition of the Aklanon people and Ati people.

=== Good Safeguarding Practices ===
Name	Year	No.	Description
The School of Living Traditions (SLT)	2021	01739	The Schools of Living Traditions (SLTs) are education institutions dedicated to indigenous arts, crafts and other traditions.

=== Elements in Need of Urgent Safeguarding ===
Name	Year	No.	Description
Buklog, thanksgiving ritual system of the Subanen	2019	01495	Buklog is a thanksgiving ritual system of the Subanon people.
The practice of making Asin Tibuok, the artisanal sea salt of the Boholano of Bohol Island, Philippines	2025	02316	Asín tibuok is a rare Filipino artisanal sea salt from the Boholano people made from filtering seawater through ashes.

== See also ==
- List of Memory of the World Documentary Heritage in the Philippines
- List of World Heritage Sites in the Philippines
- Intangible Cultural Heritage of the Philippines
