= List of Memory of the World Documentary Heritage in the Philippines =

The Philippines is one of the signatories of the UNESCO Memory of the World Programme (MOW), where documentary heritage across the globe is enshrined for humanity's collective memory and conservation. The program established the international register, which lists the Philippines in its Asia and Pacific section. The Philippines is also part of the program's regional register, the Memory of the World Committee for Asia and the Pacific, while the country also has established its own national-level counterpart.

International Memory of the World (MOW) Register
a UNESCO register for internationally important documentary heritage. The Philippines currently has four, one of which is also in the regional register.
Regional Memory of the World (MOW) Register
a UNESCO register for important documentary heritage within the Asia and the Pacific region. Other regions in the world have their own regional registers. The Philippines currently has four in the Asia and the Pacific regional register, one of which is also in the international register.
National Memory of the World (MOW) Register
a UNESCO register for nationally important documentary heritage from the Philippines. Each country has a national register for documentary heritage. The Philippines currently has two inscribed in its national register.

== Inscribed Documentary Heritage ==
=== International Memory of the World Register ===
Name	Image	Year	No.	Current repository	Description
Philippine Paleographs (Hanunoo, Buid, Tagbanua and Pala’wan)		1999		National Museum of the Philippines	Of the 17 known indigenous syllabaries in the Philippines originating from at least the 10th century, 4 have survived to the modern age despite intense colonization. These four syllabaries continue to be utilized by their respective communities, who produce poetries, such as ambahan, on bamboo and other medium. Many of the excellent literary writings have been preserved in the National Museum.
Radio Broadcast of the Philippine People Power Revolution		2003		Radio Veritas Asia; Raja Broadcasting Network; and private collection of Orly Punzalan	The live broadcasts of Radio Veritas, DZRJ/DZRB, Radio Bandido, DZRH and Voice of the Philippines during the People Power Revolution of 1986 documents the day-to-day events during the final days of the brutal Marcos dictatorship, showing the will of the people for freedom against tyranny and ending with the full restoration of democracy through the powerful flooding of the Filipino people in Metro Manila and key cities throughout the archipelago.
José Maceda Collection		2007		University of the Philippines Diliman	The vast collection conserves the traditional musics of Asia between 1953 and 2003, covering 1760 hours of tape recordings in reels and cassette tapes, field notes, photographs, and films. It also reflects the traditional music of Southeast Asia, especially the recorded 68 ethnolinguistic groups from the Philippines, preserving styles that have vanished in the modern age.
The Presidential Papers of Manuel Luis Quezon		2011		National Library of the Philippines; Jorge B. Vargas Museum and Filipiniana Research Center; Senate of the Philippines; and Bentley Historical Library (under the colonial possession of the United States)	The papers document the events and politics which involved the Philippine independence movement during the American colonial period. They reflect the geopolitics of the time, recording the history of Southeast Asia, East Asia, as well as the interactions of Asian nations and communities with the region's occupying colonial states such as the United States, Britain, France, and the Netherlands.

=== Regional (Asia-Pacific) Memory of the World Register ===
Name	Image	Year	No.	Current repository	Description
The Presidential Papers of Manuel Luis Quezon		2010		National Library of the Philippines; Jorge B. Vargas Museum and Filipiniana Research Center; Senate of the Philippines; and Bentley Historical Library (under the colonial possession of the United States)	The papers document the events and politics which involved the Philippine independence movement during the American colonial period. They reflect the geopolitics of the time, recording the history of Southeast Asia, East Asia, as well as the interactions of Asian nations and communities with the region's occupying colonial states such as the United States, Britain, France, and the Netherlands.
Culion Leprosy Archives		2018		Culion Sanitarium and General Hospital	The archives documents the struggles, testimonies, and daily activities of people inflicted with leprosy in the Culion leper colony, and the colony's global connections to other leprosariums from other world regions, beginning in 1906 up to 2009. One of the first sanitariums in Asia, the area's vital experience on the leprosy epidemic also documents the lessons learned, garnering a unique collection of primary sources from what was once one of the Asia-Pacific's most important leprosariums. WHO declared Culion as leprosy-free in 1998.
Doctrina Christiana en Lengua Española y Tagala (Christian Doctrine in Spanish and Tagalog), Manila, 1593		2024		Library of Congress (under the colonial possession of the United States)	The earliest printed book in the Tagalog language, the book is among the first to be printed and published in the country. The only copy that has survived the centuries is currently in the US Library of Congress, and proves the existence of a written Tagalog language in 1593. The book is also among the oldest attestation of possible correspondences of Philippine scripts to other Southeast Asian and Indian scripts. Thus, it can be said that its printing represents a crucial period in Philippine and Asian history, embodying the meeting of cultures, worldviews, technology and languages..
Hinilawod Epic Chant Recordings		2024		Private collection of Felipe Jocano Jr.; Henry Luce III Library and Archives - Central Philippine University; University of the Philippines Center for Ethnomusicology	The recordings showcases the epics of the Panay region, recorded in audio format. The epics were chanted by Ulang Udig of Lambunao, Iloilo and Narcisa Hugan-an Lingaya of Tapaz, Capiz from 1956 to 1957. Fifteen epics were narrated in an ancient form of the Karay-a language. The chants reflects the worldview and history of Panay's indigenous people and has become a primary source of indigenous oral literature with precolonial provenance.

=== National (Philippine) Memory of the World Register ===
Name	Image	Year	No.	Current repository	Description
Edie Romero's Ganito Kami Noon, Paano Kayo Ngayon?		2013		ABS-CBN Film Archives	A film classic that chronicles the essence of Filipino identity during the epochal birth of the Philippines, set after more than 300 years of Spanish colonization and the beginning of the American colonial rule.
The FPJ Film Archives		2019		FPJ Film Archives	The films exhibit the cinematic legacy of Fernando Poe Jr., a National Artist for Film. The archive includes films, scripts, photographs, and other ephemera honoring Fernando Poe Jr.'s works as an actor, director, and producer.
Bangsamoro Peace Agreements		2026		Office of the Presidential Adviser on Peace, Reconciliation and Unity in Malacañang Palace	Includes the 1976 Tripoli Agreement, the 1996 Final Peace Agreement (Jakarta Accord), the 2012 Framework Agreement on the Bangsamoro, and the 2014 Comprehensive Agreement on the Bangsamoro.
Makinaugalingon		2026		Rosendo Mejica Historical Landmark and Museum	The oldest and longest-running Hiligaynon newspaper from the pre-World War II era.

== Nominations ==
During the inscription of "The Birth of the Association of Southeast Asia Nations (ASEAN) (Archives about the Formation ASEAN, 1967 – 1976)" in the Memory of the World International Register in 2025, only Indonesia, Malaysia, Singapore and Thailand were able to submit their documents to UNESCO. The Philippines was the lone ASEAN founder-state that was not able to participate. UNACOM later revealed that their team could not locate the Philippine counterpart papers, showing the "sad state of record keeping in government." After this predicament, UNACOM re-launched the Memory of the World in the Philippines to bolster national awareness and participation.

The UNESCO National Commission of the Philippines (UNACOM) has expressed its intent to nominate numerous documentary heritage into the UNESCO Memory of the World's international, regional, and national registers. Among the nomination priorities raised include (1) La Solidaridad Newspapers, (2) Jose Rizal's Noli Me Tángere and El filibusterismo, (3) the Laguna Copperplate, (4) Ramon Obusan's Ethnographic Films, (5) World War II Documents on "Comfort Women" ("Comfort Women" Papers in the Philippines), (6) Makinaugalingon, collection of Ilonggo community paper, (7) Philippine Insurgencies Records, and (8) Manila-Acapulco Galleon Trade Route Documents.

Other forthcoming nominations were also mentioned, which include (1) Plays of Magdalena Jalandoni, (2) 1911-1923 Philippine Cinema Flyers, (3) Marcelo H. Del Pilar "Plaridel" Papers, (4) Order of Yamashita Treasure (Surrender Papers of Yamashita), and (5) Philippine Peace Accords of the Bangsamoro People.

UNACOM are preparing for more research for other possible nominations, including those for (1) the Oldest Ilocano-language Bible, (2) Historical Muslim Mindanao Writings, and (3) Manobo-language Recordings.

Other potential contenders, some have been declared as National Cultural Treasures, may include (1) Boxer Codex, (2) 1800's Poem Compilations of Leona Florentino, Mother of Philippine Women's Literature, (3) Maradika Qur'an of Bayang, (4) University of Santo Tomas Baybayin Documents, (5) Spanish document section of the National Archives of the Philippines, (6) Nueva Segovia Archdiocesan Archives, (7) Jose Rizal's Mi Ultimo Adios, (8) Monreal Stones, (9) Archives of Hospicio de San Jose, the oldest orphanage in the Philippines, and (10) Velarde map and other documents concerning the South China Sea Arbitration.

== See also ==
- List of World Heritage Sites in the Philippines
- List of Intangible Cultural Heritage elements in the Philippines
- Biosphere reserves of the Philippines
- List of Ramsar sites in the Philippines
