= List of Ramsar sites in the Philippines =

Ramsar logo

The Ramsar Convention (formally, the Convention on Wetlands of International Importance, especially as Waterfowl Habitat) is an international treaty for the conservation and sustainable utilization of wetlands, recognizing the fundamental ecological functions of wetlands and their economic, cultural, scientific, and recreational value. It is named after the city of Ramsar in Iran, where the Convention was signed in 1971.

The Philippines enforced the Ramsar Convention in its whole territory on November 8, 1994. Since then, Ramsar has designated 10 Ramsar sites in the country. Two Ramsar sites in the Philippines have been declared by UNESCO as World Heritage Sites, namely Puerto Princesa Subterranean River National Park, and Tubbataha Reefs Natural Park. Last August 01, 2024 another Two Ramsar sites were declared, Sibugay Wetland Nature Reserve and Del Carmen Mangrove Reserve (DCMR) in Siargao Island Protected Landscape and Seascape (SIPLAS).

A national inventory of wetland resources, based on the best scientific information available, is mandated by the Convention since 1990 through Recom 4.6. A Framework for Wetland Inventory was also established by the Convention in 2002 to aid member states in establishing their own national inventory for wetland sites. The inventory makes it possible to prioritize appropriate wetland sites for designation on the Ramsar List, similar to the tentative list of UNESCO, where UNESCO sites must always come from the tentative list. There is currently no publicly disclosed wetland inventory in the Philippines, but it is assumed that such inventory exists as the Philippines, through the Department of Environment and Natural Resources, has already nominated at least seven Philippine wetlands since 1994.

The current representation of the Philippines in Ramsar wetland nominations is inactive compared with the Ramsar wetland nominations of its peers. By comparison, the Philippines has 10 sites, while Mexico has more than 140, the archipelagic country of Japan has more than 50, the African nation of Algeria has more than 50, and the small country of South Korea has 22. The Philippines, an archipelagic country, theoretically possesses more wetlands than South Korea and North Korea combined. This has prompted various scholars to push the government to participate more in the nominations of Philippine wetlands in the Ramsar Convention. By rule, the Philippines may nominate multiple sites as Ramsar sites like what Mexico did in 2008, where at least 45 of its nominated sites were specifically declared as new Ramsar sites.

== Designated sites ==
| Site | Area | Designated | Location | Coordinates | Image | Ref. |
|---|---|---|---|---|---|---|
| Agusan Marsh Wildlife Sanctuary | 14,836 ha (36,660 acres) | November 12, 1999 | Agusan del Sur | 08°17′00″N 125°53′00″E | | |
| Las Piñas–Parañaque Critical Habitat and Ecotourism Area | 175.00 ha (432.4 acres) | March 15, 2013 | Metro Manila (Manila Bay) | 14°29′35″N 120°58′50″E | | |
| Naujan Lake National Park | 14,568 ha (36,000 acres) | November 12, 1999 | Oriental Mindoro | 13°10′00″N 121°11′00″E | | |
| Negros Occidental Coastal Wetlands Conservation Area | 89,607.8 ha (221,426 acres) | October 20, 2016 | Negros Occidental | 10°16′00″N 122°46′00″E | | |
| Olango Island Wildlife Sanctuary | 5,800 ha (14,000 acres) | July 1, 1994 | Cebu | 10°16′00″N 124°03′00″E | | |
| Puerto Princesa Subterranean River National Park | 22,202 ha (54,860 acres) | June 30, 2012 | Palawan | 10°10′00″N 118°55′00″E | | |
| Sasmuan Pampanga Coastal Wetlands | 3,667.3 ha (9,062 acres) | February 2, 2021 | Pampanga | 14°49′N 120°36′E | | |
| Tubbataha Reefs Natural Park | 6,828.00 ha (16,872.4 acres) | November 12, 1999 | Palawan (Sulu Sea) | 8°57′00″N 119°52′00″E | | |
| Sibugay Wetland Nature Reserve | 175,551.1 ha (433,796.22 acres) | August 01, 2024 | Zamboanga Sibugay | 07°33′N 122°38″E | | |
| Del Carmen Mangrove Reserve (DCMR) | 8,654.4 ha (21,385.49 acres) | August 01, 2024 | Del Carmen | 09°51′N 125°57″E | | |

== See also ==
- Environment of the Philippines
- List of protected areas of the Philippines
- Biosphere reserves of the Philippines
- List of World Heritage Sites in the Philippines
- List of Ramsar sites
- Ramsar Sites Information Service
