= Intangible Cultural Heritage of the Philippines =

Heritage register in the Philippines

Intangible cultural heritage (ICH) includes traditions and living expressions that are passed down from generation to generation within a particular community.

The Philippines, with the National Commission for Culture and the Arts as the de facto Ministry of Culture, ratified the 2003 Convention after its formal deposit in August 2006. This implies that there is an obligation to carry out the objectives of the convention to ensure the safeguarding of intangible cultural heritage. This includes identifying and documenting viable ICH elements, safeguarding and promoting viable ICH, fostering scientific, technical and artistic studies, and provide technical assistance and training in the field of ICH.

Prior to the 2003 Convention, the Philippines was invited by UNESCO to nominate intangible heritage elements for the inclusion to the Proclamation of Masterpieces of the Oral and Intangible Heritage of Humanity. This prompted the proclamation of the Hudhud chant of the Ifugao in 2001 and Darangen epic chant of the Maranao in 2005. After the establishment of the 2003 Convention, all entries to the Proclamation of Masterpieces were incorporated in the Representative List of Intangible Cultural Heritage of Humanity in 2008. A third inscription was made in 2015 through a multinational nomination between Cambodia, the Philippines, the Republic of Korea, and Viet Nam for the Tugging Rituals and Games, wherein the punnuk tugging ritual of the Ifugao was included.

As part of the objective of the Convention, the government of President Noynoy Aquino through the National Commission for Culture and the Arts' Intangible Cultural Heritage unit and in partnership with ICHCAP, published the Pinagmulan: Enumeration from the Philippine Inventory of Intangible Cultural Heritage in 2012. The publication contains an initial inventory of 335 ICH elements with elaborate discussions on 109 ICH elements. This initiative-based publication became the official basis for the government's intangible heritage programs and nominations to UNESCO. The elements listed are the first batch of continuous updating process initiated by the government, UNESCO, and other stakeholders. In 2014, the Pinagmulan was a finalist under the category of the Elfren S. Cruz Prize for Best Book in the Social Sciences in the National Book Awards organized by the National Book Development Board. The Philippine inventory is currently being updated as a measure to safeguard more intangible cultural heritage elements in the country. The updating began in 2013 and results may be released in 5–10 years after the scientific process finishes the second batch of element documentations. According to UNESCO, it is not expected by a country or state party to have a completed inventory. On the contrary, the development and updating of inventories is an ongoing process that can never be finished.

Between 2015 and 2017, UNESCO's Intangible Cultural Heritage Courier of Asia and the Pacific featured the darangen epic chant, punnuk tugging ritual, and at least three kinds of traditional healing practices in the Philippines, including the manghihilot and albularyo healing practices and belief of buhay na tubig (living water) of the Tagalog people of 20th century Quezon city, the baglan and mandadawak healing practices and stone beliefs of the Itneg people in Abra, and the mantatawak healing practices of the Tagalog people of Marinduque.

By 2016, according to the ICH Unit, National Commission for Culture and the Arts, there were 367 elements listed under the Philippine Inventory of Intangible Cultural Heritage (PIICH), the official ICH inventory of the Philippines. All elements under the PIICH are listed in Philippine Registry of Cultural Property (PRECUP), the official cultural property inventory of the country, which includes both tangible and intangible cultural properties. In April 2018, the buklog of the Subanen people was nominated by the National Commission for Culture and the Arts in the list for urgent safeguarding.

== National Living Treasures ==
As defined by UNESCO, the bearers of intangible cultural heritage are to be known internationally as Living Human Treasures. The Filipino counterparts of this title are the Gawad sa Manlilikha ng Bayan (GAMABA) awardees. There are currently 25 declared GAMABA awardees, all of which have exemplified the highest standard in their respective field of expertise. The award is only given to individuals or groups that have exhibited the highest possible standard in intangible cultural heritage.

A master of the heritage does not automatically qualify an individual or group for the award as the craft of the master should exude a higher meaning to the highest standard set by the highly critical council of the GAMABA board. Due to this lengthy and critical process, most masters are not yet declared as GAMABA awardees.

The National Living Treasures of the Philippines are as follows:

- Ginaw Bilog (d. 2003), artist and poet, Mansalay, Oriental Mindoro Poetry (Ambahan), 1993
- Masino Intaray (d. 2013), musician and epic chanter, Brookes Point, Palawan, Poetry (Kulilal and Bagit)Music (Basal / Gong), 1993
- Samaon Sulaiman (d. 2011), Musician, Mama sa Pano, Maguindanao del Sur Music (Kutyapi), 1993
- Lang Dulay, (d. 2015) textile weaver, Lake Sebu, South Cotabato, Weaving (T'nalak), 1998
- Salinta Monon (d. 2009), weaver, Bansalan, Davao del Sur, Weaving (Abaca – ikat / Inabal), 1998
- Alonzo Saclag, musician and dancer, Lubugan, Kalinga Province, Music and Dance (Kalinga), 2000
- Frederico Caballero, epic chanter, Sulod- Bukidnon, Iloilo, Poetry / Epic Chant (Sugidanon), 2000
- Uwang Ahadas, musician, Lamitan, Basilan, music (Yakan specifically Kulintang, kwitangan kayu, gabbang, agung, and tuntungan), 2000
- Darhata Sawabi, (d. 2005), weaver, Parang, Sulu, weaving (Pis Syabit), 2004
- Eduardo Mutuc, metalsmith / metal sculptor, Apalit, Pampanga, Metalwork (Bronze and Silver), 2004
- Haja Amina Appi (d. 2013), weaver, Tandubas, Tawi-Tawi, Weaving (Mat), 2004
- Teofilo Garcia, casque maker, San Quintin, Abra, Casque Making (Tabungaw), 2012
- Magdalena Gamayo, master weaver, Pinili, Ilocos Norte, Weaving (Inabel), 2012
- Ambalang Ausalin, master weaver, Lamitan, Basilan, Weaving (Yakan tennun), 2016
- Estelita Tumandan Bantilan, master weaver, Malapatan, Sarangani, Weaving (B'laan igem), 2016
- Yabing Masalon Dulo, master weaver, Polomolok, South Cotabato, Weaving (Ikat), 2016
- Adelita Romualdo Bagcal, Bard, Banna, Ilocos Norte, Dallot and other Ilocano Oral traditions, 2023
- Abina Tawide Coguit, master embroiderer, La Paz, Agusan del Sur, Suyam embroidery tradition, 2023
- Sakinur-ain Mugong Delasas, traditional dance master, Bongao, Tawi-Tawi, Igal dance tradition, 2023
- Bundos Bansil Fara, Brasscaster, Lake Sebu, South Cotabato, T'boli temwel brasscasting tradition, 2023
- Marife Ravidas Ganahon, master mat weaver,Malaybalay, Bukidnon, Higanon ikaw mat weaving tradition, 2023
- Amparo Balansi Mabanag, master embroiderer,Paracelis, Mountain Province, Ga'dang manu'bak and ameru (beadworks and embroidery) 2023
- Samporonia Pagsac Madanlo, master weaver, Caraga, Davao Oriental, Mandaya dagmay (ikat weaving) tradition 2023
- Barbara Kibed Ofong, master weaver, Lake Sebu, South Cotabato, T'boli t'nalak (ikat weaving) tradition, 2023
- Rosie Godwino Sula, chanter, Lake Sebu, South Cotabato, T'boli lingon (chanting) tradition, 2023

== UNESCO-inscribed ICH of the Philippines ==
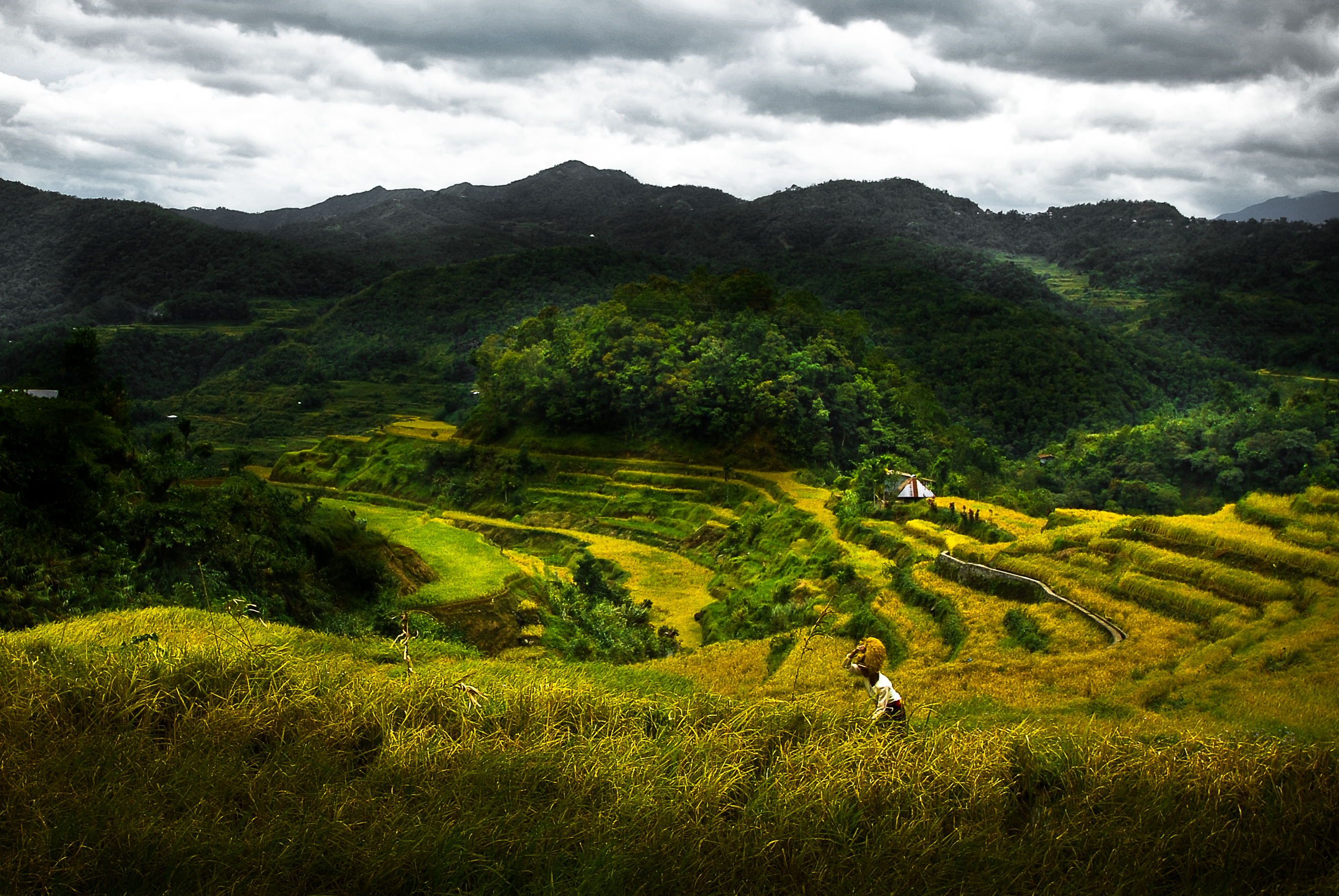
A woman chanting the Hudhud Chants of the Ifugao while harvesting grains in the Ifugao Rice Terraces. The oral tradition was declared by UNESCO as one of the "Eleven Masterpieces of the Oral and Intangible Heritage of Humanity" in 2001, and later inscribed in the UNESCO Intangible Cultural Heritage Lists in 2008.

The Philippines has a total of seven intangible cultural heritage elements inscribed in the UNESCO Intangible Cultural Heritage Lists. These are four elements inscribed in the Representative List: the Darangen epic of the Maranao people of Lake Lanao, Hudhud chants of the Ifugao, Tugging rituals and games –shared with Cambodia, South Korea, and Vietnam–, and Aklan piña handloom weaving. There is one element inscribed in the Register of Good Safeguarding Practices, The School of Living Traditions (SLT), and there are two elements inscribed in the List in Need of Urgent Safeguarding, Buklog, thanksgiving ritual of the Subanen people, and The practice of making Asin Tibuok, the artisanal sea salt of the Boholano of Bohol Island, Philippines.

=== Proposed/ongoing nominations by the Philippines ===
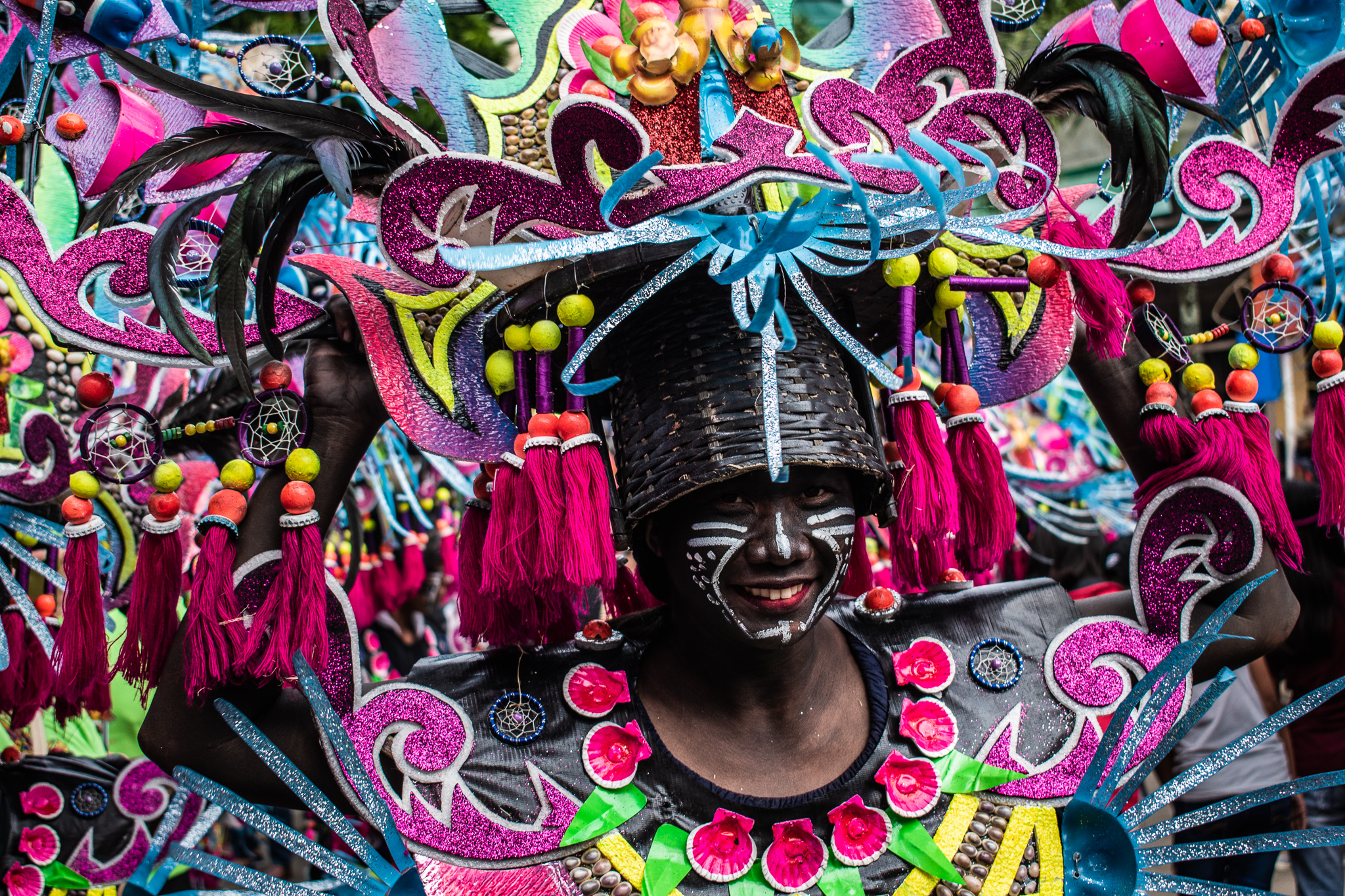
A woman at the Kalibo Ati-Atihan Festival.

Numerous elements are being proposed for nomination by the Philippines for inclusion in the intangible cultural heritage lists within the coming few years. Among these elements are:

1. Kapayvanuvanuwa Fishing Ritual of the Ivatan of Batanes
2. Batek/Batok Tattoo-making Tradition of the Butbut People of Kalinga
3. Ati-atihan festival of the people of Aklan
4. Metal and wood craftsmanship of the Maranao of Lanao
5. Tepo mat weaving of the Sama people of Tawi-tawi
6. Traditional Boatbuilding and Maritime Culture of the peoples of Batanes and Tawi-tawi
7. Tradition of Atang of the Ilocano people
8. Cosmology of the Mangyans of Mindoro
9. Moriones festival of the people of Marinduque
10. Hinilawod Epics of the people of Panay
11. Ulaging Epic of the Talaandig Manobo of Bukidnon
12. Kudaman Epic of the Pala'wan people of Palawan
13. Buklog rituals of the Subanen people of Zamboanga Peninsula
14. Apung Iru fluvial festival of the Kapampangan people of Apalit
15. Kalibo piña weaving of the Aklanon people of Aklan
16. Digdiga Ni Tupayya courtship dance of the Kalinga people.

The Philippines is a member of the committee on intangible cultural heritage since 2016, and will end its term in 2019. In 2017, the Ambassador of the Philippines to France and UNESCO urged the Philippine government to nominate the Metal and wood craftsmanship of the Maranao of Lanao in the list in need for urgent safeguarding for 2018. On 20 February 2018, the government and the stakeholders of Aklan met for the preparation of the dossier of the Kalibo piña weaving intangible cultural heritage. Additionally, on 9 April 2018, the NCCA nominated the buklog rituals of the Subanen people to the list in need for urgent safeguarding. UNESCO set the nomination of buklog for the 2019 inscription cycle.

== Intangible Cultural Heritage of the Philippines according to the Pinagmulan ==
The National Commission for Culture and the Arts through its UNESCO-backed Pinagmulan book, inventory of Philippine intangible cultural heritage initiated the first part of the country's intangible heritage inventory. Elements highlighted with light blue are UNESCO-inscribed intangible heritage, while elements highlighted in red are UNESCO-inscribed elements that are in need of urgent safeguarding. Presently, there are 367 elements listed under the Philippine Inventory of Intangible Cultural Heritage (PIICH), which is under the Philippine Registry of Cultural Property (PRECUP). According to UNESCO, intangible cultural heritage has five domains, namely: oral traditions and expressions, including language as a vehicle of the intangible cultural heritage; performing arts; social practices, rituals and festive events; knowledge and practices concerning nature and the universe; and traditional craftsmanship.

== Indigenous groups ==
The indigenous peoples of the Philippines consist of a large number of Austronesian ethnic groups, as well as Negritos. They are the bearers of the majority of intangible cultural heritage elements deemed as significant to the Filipino psyche. They are the descendants of the original Austronesian inhabitants of the Philippines, that settled in the islands thousands of years ago, and in the process have retained their Indigenous customs and traditions.

In 1990, more than 100 highland peoples constituted approximately three percent of the Philippine population. Over the centuries, the isolated highland peoples have retained their indigenous cultures. The folk arts of these groups were, in a sense, the last remnants of Indigenous traditions that flourished throughout the Philippines before the Islamic and Spanish contacts.

The highland peoples are a primitive ethnic group like other Filipinos, although they did not, as a group, have as much contact with the outside world. These peoples displayed a variety of native cultural expressions and artistic skills. They showed a high degree of creativity such as the production of bowls, baskets, clothing, weapons and spoons. These peoples ranged from various groups of Igorot people, a group that includes the Bontoc, Ibaloi, Ifugao, Isneg, Kalinga and Kankana-ey, who built the Rice Terraces thousands of years ago. They have also covered a wide spectrum in terms of their integration and acculturation with Christian Filipinos. Other Indigenous peoples include the Lumad peoples of the highlands of Mindanao. These groups have remained isolated from Western and Eastern influences.

Due to the influx of Christianity, Islam, and other world religions in traditional communities, the indigenous practices, rituals, and spiritual performances and knowledge of indigenous Filipinos are fast disappearing. Cultural workers in the country suggest the Paiwan Model, which was made by the Taiwanese government to preserve indigenous religions, to save the Philippines' own indigenous religions. The indigenous practices and shamanism of the Paiwan people of Taiwan was the fastest declining religion in the country. This prompted the Taiwanense government to preserve the religion and to push for the establishment of the Paiwan School of Shamanism where religious leaders teach their apprentices the native religion so that it will never be lost. It became an effective medium in preserving, and even uplifting the Paiwan people's indigenous religion. In the Philippines, shamanism is referred as dayawism, meaning 'gallant religions that give thanks to all living and non-living things'. As of 2018, there is no established school of dayawism in the Philippines, making the hundreds of indigenous religions in the country in great peril from extinction due to the influx of colonial-era religions. Each indigenous religion in the Philippines is distinct from each other, possessing unique epics, pantheons, belief systems, and other intangible heritage pertaining to religious beliefs. Due to this immense diversity in indigenous religions, a singular school of dayawism is not feasible. Rather, hundreds of schools of dayawism pertaining to an ethno-linguistic tribe is a better supplement to the current religious landscape in the Philippines.

== Domain 1: Oral Traditions and Expressions, including Language ==
Intangible cultural element^{[A]}	Practicing ethnic group/s and geographic areas where element is practiced^{[B]}	Short description^{[C]}
Hudhud Epic Chant	Ifugao people of Ifugao province	The element was declared by UNESCO as one of the representative intangible elements of humanity in 2001. It was later inscribed as a UNESCO intangible heritage element in 2008. The element was properly documented from 2008 to December 2009 by the National Commission of the Philippines and the U.S. embassy in the Philippines.
Biag ni Lam-ang Epic	Ilokano people of the provinces of Ilocos Norte, Ilocos Sur, and Abra	The national epic of the Ilokano people.
Diwata Kasinebangan	Maguindanaon ethnic groups in the Maguindanao provinces	
Darangen Epic Chant	Maranao/Maguindanaon people of Lanao del Sur and neighboring areas	The element was declared by UNESCO as one of the representative intangible elements of humanity in 2005. It was later inscribed as a UNESCO intangible heritage element in 2008.
Dimakaling	Maranao/Maguindanao peoples of Lanao del Sur and neighboring areas	
Diwata Kasaripan	Maranao/Maguindanao peoples of Lanao del Sur and neighboring areas	
Radia Indarapatra	Maranao people of Lanao del Sur	
Salsila	Tausug people of the three Sulu archipelago provinces	
Ag Tubog Keboklogan	Subanon/Subanen people of the provinces of Zamboanga region	
Kudaman, Tuwaang Epic Cycle	Manobo people of Central Mindanao	
Uwaging (also Agyu)	Manobo, Agusan people of Northern Mindanao	
Alim Epic	Ifugao people of Ifugao province	The Alim Epic was properly documented from 2008 to December 2009 by the National Commission of the Philippines and the U.S. embassy in the Philippines, making it more viable to be nominated in the UNESCO intangible cultural heritage list in the future.
Ulalim Epic	Kalinga people of Kalinga province	
Ulahingan	Manobo, Livunganen/Aroman people of the Livungan Valley and Cotabato	
Ulaging Epic	Talaandig Manobo of Bukidnon province	
Dulimaman Epic	Itneg people of Ilocos Norte, Ilocos Sur, and Abra	In 2016, the U.S. embassy in the Philippines and the National Commission for Culture and the Arts began recording a complete version of the Dulimaman Epic of the Itneg people. Once finished, the epic will be transcribed and translated by native speakers and will be turned into book with English translation. The project will end in September 2019. Once finished, the epic is expected to be nominated to the UNESCO list of intangible cultural heritage.
Mi'Raj	Sama Dilaut people of Tawi-tawi province	
Silungan Baltapa (a Kata-Kata)	Sama Dilaut people of Tawi-tawi province	
Ginem/Ginum	Bagobo people of the Cotabato and Davao regions	
Ambahan Poetry	Hanunoo Mangyan of the Mindoro provinces	From 2012 to September 2013, the Mangyan Heritage Center, Inc. and the U.S. Embassy in the Philippines administered the conservation program for the Ambahan Poetry and the Hanunoo Mangyan script. The program included the continued teaching of the script and ambahan poetry to 10 Hanunoo Mangyan schools in Mindoro. Another preservation program was launched by the same institutions in 2016 for the conservation and documentation of the Hanunuo script, along with the Buhid script. The program is expected to conclude in September 2021.
Bantugan	Maguindanao people of Maguindanao provinces and neighboring Cotabato provinces	
Maharadia Lawana	Maranao people of the Lanao provinces	
Parang Sabil	Tausug people of Sulu, Basilan, and Tawi-tawi	
Biwag anni Malana	Gaddang people of Mountain Province	
Lumalindaw Epic	Gaddang people of Mountain Province	
Kanag Kababagowan	Itneg people of Abra province	
Agyu Epic	Manobo people of North Cotabato province	
Guman Epic	Subanon people of the Zamboanga region	
Hinilawod Epic (Humadapnon)	Sulod people of Panay provinces, specifically Antique	
Hinilawod Epic (Labaw Donggon)	Sulod people of Panay provinces, specifically Antique	
Sondayo Epic	Subanon people of the Zamboanga region	
Loa	Tagalog people of Batanga province and Zamboanga provinces	
“Upuan” Etymology	Itneg people of Abra province	
Kudaman Epic	Tagbanwa/Pala'wan people of Palawan province	
Ikalahan Origin Myth	Ikalahan people of Nueva Viscaya province	
Laji	Ivatan people of Batanes province	
Bangus Banter	Tagalog people of Bulacan province	

== Domain 2: Performing Arts ==
Intangible cultural element^{[A]}	Practicing ethnic group/s and geographic areas where element is practiced^{[B]}	Short description^{[C]}
Arakyo	Tagalog people of Nueva Ecija province	
Sagayan	Maranao/Maguindanao people of Lanao del Sur and Maguindanao provinces	
Zarzuela – Musical Theatre	Tagalog people countrywide	The zarzuela musical theatre is currently being pushed by the government to be declared as a UNESCO intangible cultural heritage element. The performing art may be nominated together with Spain, Mexico, and Cuba. This is widely supported by various zarzuela dance, music, and theatre companies in the Philippines.
Singkil Dance	Maranao people of Lanao del Sur	
Moro y Cristianos Street Drama	Tagalog people countrywide	
Pasion	Tagalog people of Marinduque province	
Moriones Festival	Tagalog people of Marinduque province	
Kuratsa Dance	Waray people of Samar provinces and Leyte province	
Kambuyok/Kambuyoka Song Joust	Maranao people of Lanao del Sur	

== Domain 3: Social Practices, Rituals, and Festive Events ==
Intangible cultural element^{[A]}	Practicing ethnic group/s and geographic areas where element is practiced^{[B]}	Short description^{[C]}
Bogwa	Ifugao people of Ifugao province	
Sayo	Bicolano people of Camarines Sur province	
Buklog Rites	Subanon people of Zamboanga provinces	The Buklog Rites was nominated by the National Commission for Culture and the Arts for inscription in the UNESCO List for Urgent Safeguarding in April 2018. The element is widely supported by all provincial governments in the Zamboanga region, along with ethnic Subanen leaders and shamans throughout the region.
Panlisig-Panumanod Ritual	Umayamnon Manobo people of the eastern sections of Bukidnon province	
Ifugao Agricultural Rituals (1)	Ifugao people of Ifugao province	
Ifugao Agricultural Rituals (2)	Ifugao people of Ifugao province	
Ifugao Agricultural Rituals (3)	Ifugao people of Ifugao province	
Uyaue (Baiya) Ritual	Ifugao people of Ifugao province	
Ifugao Agricultural Rituals (4)	Ifugao people of Ifugao province	
Bullul Rituals	Ifugao people of Ifugao province	
Balog	Ifugao people of Ifugao province	
Uyauy Ritual	Ifugao people of Ifugao province	
Hagabi Rites	Ifugao, Tuwali people of Ifugao province	
Pechen (Peace Pact)	Bontoc people of Mountain Province	
Bontoc Agricultural Rituals (1)	Bontoc people of Mountain Province	
Rain Rituals	Bontoc people of Mountain Province	
Scare Crow Ritual	Bontoc people of Mountain Province	
Tengao (Days of Rest)	Bontoc people of Mountain Province	
Kankanaey Agricultural Rites	Kankanaey people of Mountain Province	
Nalandangan	Umayamnon Manobo people of the eastern portions of Bukidnon province	
Bowag Mock Battle	Kankanaey people of Sagada in Mountain Province	
Bagbagto (Mock War)	Bontoc people of Mountain Province	
Kalinga Life Cycle Rites	Kalinga people of Kalinga province	
Kontad Rituals	Kalinga people of Kalinga province	
Kalinga Pechen/Pud'on/Budong (Peace Pact)	Kalinga people of Kalinga province	
Kodama Ritual (Death Rites)	Kalinga people of Kalinga province	
Dap'ay (Ab'abungan, Abong, Ato, Ator, Avuwan, Dalipuy)	Bontoc people of Mountain Province	
Patay Ritual	Bontoc people of Mountain Province	
Bagobo Agricultural Rituals	Bagobo people of Davao and Cotabato provinces	
Hanunoo Mangyan Burial Rituals	Hanunoo Mangyan people of Mindoro provinces	
Panudlak Agricultural Rituals	Hanunoo Mangyan people of Mindoro provinces	
T'boli Marriage Rituals	T'boli people of South Cotabato province	
Maguindanao Marriage Rituals (1)	Maguindanaon people of the Maguindanao provinces	
Sulod Burial Practices	Sulod people of Panay provinces	
Pala'wan (Tagbanwa) Runsay	Pala'wan people of Palawan province	
Subanon Harvest Rituals	Subanon people of Zamboanga region	
Pagdiwata Ritual	Tagbanwa people of Palawan province	
Lambay Ritural	Tagbanwa people of Palawan province	
Sungrud Ritual	Tagbanwa people of Palawan province	
Sandugo	Tagbanwa people of Palawan province	
Ilocano Agricultural Rituals	Ilocano people of Ilocos Norte, Ilocos Sur, and La Union provinces	
Ilocano Marriage Rituals	Ilocano people of Ilocos Norte, Ilocos Sur, and La Union provinces	
Atang – Ilocano Appeasement Ritual	Ilocano people of Ilocos Norte, Ilocos Sur, and Abra provinces	
B'laan (Danlag) Agricultural Cycle	B'laan people of South Cotabato province	
B'laan (Danlag) Marriage Ritual	B'laan people of South Cotabato province	
B'laan (Sal Naong) Agricultural Cycle	B'laan people of Sultan Kudarat province	
B'laan (Datal Blao) Agricultural Cycle	B'laan people of Sultan Kudarat province	
Manobo Marriage Rituals	Western Bukidnon Manobo people of Bukidnon province	
Pangnga Ritual	Ifugao people of Ifugao province	
Ifugao (Ayangan) Agricultural Rituals	Ayangan, Ifugao people of Ifugao province	
Pa'hang Ritual	Ayangan, Ifugao people of Ifugao province	
Pu'al Rite (Death Rites)	Ifugao people of Ifugao province	
Baltong	Ifugao people of Ifugao province	
Ifugao Marriage Ceremonials	Ifugao people of Ifugao province	
Kankanaey Death/Burial Rituals	Kankanaey people of Mountain Province	
Kankanaey Marriage Rituals (1)	Kankanaey people of Mountain Province	
Harvest Rituals in Hapao	Tuwali Ifugao people of Ifugao province	
T'boli Death and Burial Rites	T'boli people of South Cotabato province	
Apayao Ritual Feast for Anitos	Apayao (Isneg) people of Apayao province	
Say'am Ritual	Apayao people of Apayao province	
Cal-las (Death Ritual)	Itneg people of Abra province	
Ibaloy Pedit	Ibaloy people of Benguet province	
Kankanaey/Kankanai Pedit (Prestige Feast)	Kankanaey people of Benguet province	
Pakde	Ibaloy people of Benguet province	
Lawit (Appeasement Rites)	Ibaloy people of Benguet province	
Ibaloy Rituals (Listing Briefs)	Ibaloy people of Benguet province	
Lifon Agricultural Rituals	Bontoc people of Mountain Province	
Mangmang Birth Ritual	Bontoc people of Mountain Province	
Bontoc Death Rituals	Bontoc people of Mountain Province	
Bontoc Agricultural Rituals 2	Bontoc people of Mountain Province	
Bontoc House-building Rituals	Bontoc people of Mountain Province	
Bontoc Terracing Rituals	Bontoc people of Mountain Province	
Bontoc Fire Ritual	Bontoc people of Mountain Province	
Sayang	Itneg people of Abra province	
Palpaliwat	Kalinga people of Kalinga province	
Maranao Agricultural Rites	Maranao people of Lanao del Sur province	
Pag-gunting Rites	Tausug people of Sulu, Basilan, and Tawi-tawi provinces	
Tausug Marriage Rituals	Tausug people of Sulu, Basilan, and Tawi-tawi provinces	
Tausug Pag-Islam	Tausug people of Sulu, Basilan, and Tawi-tawi provinces	
Tausug Pag-Tammat Rituals	Tausug people of Sulu, Basilan, and Tawi-tawi provinces	
Kalilang Festival	Maranao people of Lanao del Sur province	
Jama Mapun Rites of Passage	Jama Mapun people of Tawi-tawi province	
Hamboki'an	Ikalahan people of Nueva Viscaya province	
Ikalahan Ritual Format	Ikalahan people of Nueva Viscaya province	
Pagkombiti Marriage Ritual	Mamanua/Mamanwa people of Surigao del Norte province	
Mamanwa Kahimonan (Pig Ritual)	Mamanua/Mamanwa people of Surigao del Norte province	
Lekat (Ritual Massage)	Maguindanaon peoples of the Maguindanao provinces	
Kanggunting Rite of Passage	Maguindanao peoples of Maguindanao and Cotabato provinces	
Bilang Ceremonies	Tagbanwa people of Palawan province	
Tagbanwa Agricultural Rituals	Tagbanwa people of Palawan province	
Pagbuy'is Ritual	Tagbanwa people of Palawan province	
Sama Mortuary Rituals	Sama people of Tawi-taiw province	
Itneg Rice Rituals	Itneg people of Abra province	
Itneg Birth Cycle Rituals	Itneg people of Abra province	
Itneg Marriage Rituals	Itneg people of Abra province	
Itneg Death and Burial Rituals	Itneg people of Abra province	
Itneg Dawak Ritual	Itneg people of Abra province	
Pinaing/Pinading Ritual	Itneg people of Abra province	
Saloko Ritual	Itneg people of Abra province	
Bakid Ritual	Itneg people of Abra province	
Sangasang Ritual	Itneg people of Abra province	
Sagobay Ritual	Itneg people of Abra province	
Ngorong'or Rites	Itneg people of Abra province	
Pala-an Ritual	Itneg people of Abra province	
Tangpap Ritual	Itneg people of Abra province	
Kalangan Ritual	Itneg people of Abra province	
Pinasal Ritual	Itneg people of Abra province	
Binukwau Ritual	Itneg people of Abra province	
Kalanguya Sapsap Burial Rituals	Kalanguya Ifugao people of Ifugao province	
Kalanguya Agricultural Rituals	Kalanguya Ifugao people of Ifugao province	
Kalinga Marriage Ritual	Kalinga people of Kalinga province	
Kalinga Death Rituals	Kalinga people of Kalinga province	
Kankanaey Birth Rituals	Kankanaey people of Mountain Province	
Kankanaey Marriage Rituals (2)	Kankanaey people of Mountain Province	
Kankanaey Death Rituals	Kankanaey people of Mountain Province	
Bontoc Marriage Rituals	Bontoc people of Mountain Province	
Bontoc Borth Rituals	Bontoc people of Mountain Province	
Padapadakam Ritual	Ilocano people of Ilocos Norte, Ilocos Sur, and Abra provinces	
Begnas Ritual	Bontoc people of Mountain Province	
Gaddang Rituals (Miscellaneous)	Gaddang people of Nueva Viscaya, Mountain Province, and Abra provinces	
Mamattang/Makikeng Ritual	Ibanag people of Cagayan province	
Maffusi Ritual (Corn Harvest)	Ibanag people of Cagayan province	
Ifugao Marriage Rituals	Ifugao people of Ifugao province	Ifugao (Northern Luzon)
Ifugao Death/After Death Rituals	Ifugao people of Ifugao province	
Ifugao Sickness Rites	Ifugao people of Ifugao province	
Ifugao Specialized Rituals	Ifugao people of Ifugao province	
Ifugao Agricultural Rituals	Ifugao people of Ifugao province	
Buayat Ritual	Ilongot people of Nueva Viscaya province	
Kalinga Meat-sharing System	Kalinga people of Kalinga province	
Panyang Ritual	Ilocano people of Ilocos Norte, Ilocos Sur, and La Union provinces	
Erwap (Rain Ritual)	Bontoc people of Mountain Province	
Panulak Balah	Tausug people of Sulu, Basilan, and Tawi-tawi provinces	
Hari Raya Puasa	Muslims of Philippine Islamic provinces	
Shariff Kabunsuan	Maguindanao peoples of the Maguindanao provinces	
Peñafrancia Fluvial Festival	Bicolano people of Camarines Sur province	
Bocaue Fluvial Festival	Tagalog people of Bulacan province	
San Clemente Festival	Tagalog people of Rizal province	
Sta. Clara Festival	Tagalog people of Bulacan province	
Apung Iru	Kapampangan people of Pampanga province	
Kuraldal Atlung Ari	Kapampangan people of Pampanga province	
Mo-ninum Ritual	T'boli people of South Cotabato province	
Moriones Festival	Tagalog people of Marinduque province	
Tungo Ritual	Bontok Tadian people of Mountain Province	
Palpaliwat (2)	Kalinga people of Kalinga province	
Ati-atihan Festival	Aklanon people of Aklan province	
Uhag Ritual	Ifugao, Tuwali people of Ifugao province	
Him'ong/Him'ung	Ifugao people of Ifugao province	
Kalinga Deities	Kalinga people of Kalinga province	
Yabyab Rites	Kalinga people of Kalinga province	
Kalinga Courtship/Marriage	Kalinga people of Kalinga province	
Bukidnon Iloilo Agricultural Rites	Ilonggo people of Iloilo province	
Isama Rites – Samal Island	Isamal people of Davao del Sur province	
Kalagan Rites of Passage	Kalagan people of Davao del Sur province	
Kalinga Meat-sharing System	Kalinga people of Kalinga province	
Kalinga Transfer of Property	Kalinga people of Kalinga province	
Igam Ritual	Kalinga people of Kalinga province	
Adumba Rituals	Kalinga people of Kalinga province	
Datum Rite	Kalinga people of Kalinga province	
Kankanaey Agricultural Rituals	Kankanaey, Ibesao people of Mountain Province	
Gobgobo Rituals (Kankanaey Birth)	Kankanaey, Ibesao people of Mountain Province	
Dawdawak Ritual	Kankanaey, Ibesao people of Mountain Province	
Kankanaey Death Rituals	Kankanaey, Ibesao people of Mountain Province	
Kankanaey Specific Rituals	Kankanaey people of Mountain Province	
Kankanaey Prayers for Healing	Kankanaey people of Mountain Province	
Kankanaey Prayers of Supplication	Kankanaey people of Mountain Province	
Kankanaey Prayers of Thanks	Kankanaey people of Mountain Province	
Kankanaey Prayers Related to Animals	Kankanaey people of Mountain Province	
Kankanaey Prayers for Illness Caused by Spirits	Kankanaey people of Mountain Province	
Kankanaey Prayers for Illness of Psychological Cause	Kankanaey people of Mountain Province	
Kankanaey Prayers as Preventive Measures	Kankanaey people of Mountain Province	
Gomek Gomanan	Bagobo Tagabawa people of Davao del Sur province	
Antipo Ritual	Tagalog people of Marinduque province	
Pupuwa Ritual	Tagalog people of Marinduque province	
Mangyan Exorcism Rites	Hanunoo Mangyan people of Mindoro provinces	
Novicia/Novicio Practice	Tagalog people of Marinduque province	
Hanunoo Mangyan Secondary Burial Rites	Hanunoo Mangyan people of Mindoro provinces	
Kapayvanuvanuwa Fishing Ritual	Ivatan people of Batanes province	The Kapayvanuvanuwa Fishing Ritual is currently undergoing a process for future nomination in UNESCO.
Kapangdeng Ritual	Ivatan people of Batanes province	
Echague Boat	Sama Balangingi people of Isabela province	
Maranao Traditional Death Rituals	Maranao people of Lanao del Sur province	
Maranao After-Birth Rituals	Maranao people of Lanao del Sur province	
Kasemang (Visit to a Newly constructed House)	Maranao people of Lanao del Sur province	
Itneg Rice Rituals	Itneg people of Abra province	
Maranao Beliefs About Birth	Maranao people of Lanao del Sur province	
Ba'i a Labi Coronation	Maranao people of Lanao del Sur province	
Maranao Pagana (Traditional Feast)	Maranao people of Lanao del Sur province	
Kapamangamay Totem Ritual	Maranao people of Lanao del Sur province	
Punnuk (Traditional Tugging Ritual)	Tuwali, Ifugao people of Ifugao province	The element was declared by UNESCO as one of the representative intangible elements of humanity and inscribed as a UNESCO intangible heritage element in 2015 under the element of Tugging rituals and games, together with other tug-of-war games from other Asian countries.
Holy Week Rituals in Camarines Sur	Bicolano people of Camarines Sur province	
Kalinga Courtship and Marriage	Kalinga people of Kalinga province	
Wearing Old Hats	All ethnic groups in the Philippines	
Mangyan Betel-nut Chewing	Hanunoo Mangyan people of Mindoro provinces	
Pasaka	Hanunoo Mangyan of Mindoro provinces	
Angono Festivals	Tagalog people of Rizal province	
Bagongonon	Kalinga people of Kalinga province	
Kesiyahan	T'boli people of South Cotabato province	
The Night the Fires Go Out	Kankanaey people of Mountain Province	
Putong/Putungan	Tagalog people of Marinduque province	
Magpandipandi	Yakan people of Basilan province	
Agsana – Salt-making	Ilocano people of Ilocos Norte province	
Hanunoo Mangyan House-building	Hanunoo Mangyan people of Mindoro provinces	
Ilocano Atang for the Dead	Ilocano people of Ilocos Norte province	
Hanunoo Mangyan Life Cycles	Hanunoo Mangyan of Mindoro provinces	
Hanunoo Mangyan Kinship	Hanunoo Mangyan people of Mindoro provinces	

== Domain 4: Knowledge and Practices Concerning Nature and the Universe ==
Intangible cultural element^{[A]}	Practicing ethnic group/s and geographic areas where element is practiced^{[B]}	Short description^{[C]}
Ifugao Deities	Ifugao people of Ifugao province	
B'laan Astrology	B'laan people of Sultan Kudarat province	
Hanunoo Mangyan Natural Phenomena Rituals	Hanunoo Mangyan of Mindoro provinces	
Hanunoo Mangyan Cosmology	Hanunoo Mangyan of Mindoro provinces	
Jama Mapun Constellation of Tanggong	Jama Mapun people of Tawi-tawi province	
Tagbanwa/Pala'wan Cosmology	Tagbanwa/Pala'wan people of Palawan province	
Tala'andig Cosmology	Tala'andig Manobo people of Bukidnon province	
Klata Cosmology	Klata Manobo people of Bukidnon province	
Manuvu Cosmology	Manuvu people of North Cotabato province	
Matigsalug Cosmology	Matigsalug people of Bukidnon and Davao provinces	
Kalagan Beliefs	Kalagan people of Davao del Sur province	
Hanunoo Mangyan Supernaturals	Hanunoo Mangyan of Mindoro provinces	
Mangyan Death Practices	Hanunoo Mangyan of Mindoro provinces	
Punhugutan	Hanunoo Mangyan of Mindoro provinces	
Tau't Batu Cosmology	Tau't Batu people of Palawan province	The Tau't Batu cosmology is currently being pushed by the government to be declared as a UNESCO intangible cultural heritage element. This is supported by the provincial government of Palawan and the ethnic Tau't Batu of the Paleolithic site of Singnapan valley.
Jama Mapun Constellations	Jama Mapun people of Tawi-tawi province	
B'laan Sacred Trees	B'laan people of Davao del Sur province	
B'laan Rain-making	B'laan of Davao del Sur province	
Sacred Mountains	B'laan of Davao del Sur province	
Pamitu'on/Pamateun – Astral Lore	Matigsalug Manobo people of Bukidnon province	

== Domain 5: Traditional Craftsmanship ==
Intangible cultural element^{[A]}	Practicing ethnic group/s and geographic areas where element is practiced^{[B]}	Short description^{[C]}
Maranao Metak-casting with Wire Templates	Maranao people of Lanao del Sur province	
Kalutang Instruments	Tagalog people of Marinduque province	
Pis syabit	Tausug people of Basilan, Sulu, and Tawi-tawi provinces	
Maranao Brass-casting	Maranao people of Lanao del Sur province	
Maranao Brass-stamping	Maranao people of Lanao del Sur province	
Maranao Goldsmithing	Tugaya Maranao people of Lanao del Sur province	
Baor-making	Tugaya Maranao people of Lanao del Sur province	
Tabo-making	Tugaya Maranao people of Lanao del Sur province	
Maranao Weaving	Tugaya Maranao people of Lanao del Sur province	
Traditional Boats in Batanes	Ivatan people of Batanes province	
Sinadumparan Ivatan House Types	Ivatan people of Batanes province	
Ivatan Basketry	Ivatan people of Batanes province	
Torogan – Royalty House	Maranao people of Lanao del Sur province	The Torogan Royalty House has been cited as one of the traditional craftsmanship elements of the Philippines that may be nominated by the government for urgent safeguarding within the coming years.
Salakot	Tagalog people in Tagalog provinces	
Yakan Musical Instruments	Yakan people in Basilan province	
Bubo and Other Fish Traps	Ilocano people of Ilocos Norte, Ilocos Sur, Abra, and La Union provinces	
Sarimanok	Maranao people of Lanao del Sur province	
Back-strap Weaving	All ethnic groups throughout the country	
Ikat Weaving	All ethnic groups throughout the country	Widespread
Langkit: Tobira and Lakban	Maranao people of Lanao del Sur province	
Lantaka	Maranao/Maguindanao people of Lanao and Maguindanao provinces	
Morion Head Mask	Tagalog people of Marinduque province	
Mountain Terraces	Ifugao people of Ifugao province	
Maranao Woodworking	Maranao people of Lanao del Sur province	
Ilocano Goldsmithing	Ilocano people of Ilocos Norte and Ilocos Sur provinces	
Buntal Hat	Tagalog people of Quezon province	
Yuvuk	Itbayat people of Batanes province	
Pagkakayas	Tagalog people of Laguna province	
Piña Loom-weaving	Aklanon people of Aklan province	
Singkaban	Tagalog people of Bulacan province	
Tepo Mat (Baluy Mat Weaving)	Sama people of Tawi-tawi province	
Tikog Mat	Waray people of Samar provinces	
Philippine Textile Weaving	Various ethnic groups countrywide	From 2012 to September 2013, the National Commission for Culture and the Arts and the U.S. Embassy in the Philippines initiated the documentation of Philippine textile art traditions. The program resulted into the publishing of Journey of a Thousand Shuttles: The Philippine Weave, a book which comprehensively exhibits the documentation conducted by the two institutions.
Ivatan (Salakot) Hat Weaving	Ivatan/Itbayat people of Batanes province	
Balaka – Nito Hat	Kankanaey people of Quirino province	
Saked – Broom-making	Kalinga people of Kalinga province	

== See also ==
- List of Cultural Properties of the Philippines
- List of World Heritage Sites in the Philippines
- National Living Treasures Award (Philippines)
- List of Memory of the World Documentary Heritage in the Philippines
- Art in the Philippines
