= List of World Heritage Sites in the Philippines =

Location of World Heritage Sites in the Philippines. Blue dots indicate the Baroque Churches.

The United Nations Educational, Scientific and Cultural Organization (UNESCO) World Heritage Sites are places of importance to cultural or natural heritage as described in the UNESCO World Heritage Convention, established in 1972. The convention established that cultural heritage consists of monuments (such as architectural works, monumental sculptures, or inscriptions), groups of buildings, and sites (including archaeological sites). Meanwhile, natural heritage consists of physical and biological formations, geological and physiographical formations (including habitats of threatened flora and fauna), and sites used for scientific research and/or conservation, as well as those regarded for its natural aesthetic.

The Republic of the Philippines ratified the convention on September 19, 1985, making its historical and natural sites eligible for inclusion on the list. The country had its first sites (the Baroque Churches and Tubbataha Reefs Natural Park) included in 1993, and now has six sites, the latest being the Mount Hamiguitan Range Wildlife Sanctuary in 2014. Of those six sites, three each are cultural and natural. In addition, the government of the Philippines has also put 19 sites on the tentative list, meaning that they intend to consider them for nomination in the future. The lack of World Heritage Sites were mainly reasoned to little awareness among locals, the absence of competent people involved, and the lack of government funding. One site, the Rice Terraces of the Philippine Cordilleras, was previously listed as a World Heritage in Danger due to the lack of conservation and monitoring efforts, but has since been removed as an endangered site due to successful community and government conservation actions.

== World Heritage Sites ==
UNESCO lists sites under ten criteria; each entry must meet at least one of the criteria. Criteria i through vi are cultural, and vii through x are natural.

World Heritage Sites
Site	Image	Location (region)	UNESCO data	Year listed	Description
Baroque Churches of the Philippines		City of Manila; Ilocos Sur; Ilocos Norte; Iloilo, Western Visayas	677bis; ii, vi (cultural)	1993	During the Spanish colonial period between the 16th and 18th centuries, Spain designed four Roman Catholic churches in the Philippines, with the help of Chinese and Filipino workers. They are the Churches of San Agustin (pictured), Santa Maria, Paoay, and Miagao. Using a modified Baroque architecture style, it was built using local materials to withstand the country's climate, and thus paved the way for the expansion of churches in the country.
Tubbataha Reefs Natural Park		Palawan, Mimaropa	653bis; vii, ix, x (natural)	1993	Located at the heart of the Sulu Sea, this site includes the reef's northern and southern atoll, as well as the Jessie Beazley Reef, totalling at 96,828 hectares. In addition to a 100-meter coral reef, it houses 360 coral and around 700 fish species, notably whales, dolphins, sharks, turtles, and the humphead wrasse. It also has one of the few seabird colonies on Earth. A battery of barracudas is pictured.
Rice Terraces of the Philippine Cordilleras		Ifugao, Cordillera	722; iii, iv, v (cultural)	1995	This site includes the Banaue, Mayoyao, Hungduan, and Nagacadan Rice Terraces. They were established 2,000 years prior to inscription in pre-colonial Philippines, by the local Ifugao people. Despite its shared, unique heights and steepness, each have their own facade. Banaue in particular consists of two terraces: Bangaan and Batad (pictured), both located nearby a village. From 2001 to 2012, with the lack of a conservation and monitoring effort, UNESCO listed it as a World Heritage in Danger.
Historic City of Vigan		Ilocos Sur, Ilocandia	502rev; ii, iv (cultural)	1999	Vigan is a city built during the Spanish colonial period in the 16th century. Situated at the delta of the Abra River, it used to be a trading post. The 17.25-hectare site displays its architecture, a fusion of Filipino, Chinese, European, and Mexican architecture. For instance, some parts do not fully conform to the grid plan as required by the Laws of the Indies. The two plazas, Salcedo and Burgos, contain a cathedral, an archbishop palace, a city hall, and the Provincial Capitol Building. In total, there are 233 historic buildings in the site. Pictured is the Calle Crisologo street.
Puerto Princesa Subterranean River National Park		Palawan, Mimaropa	652rev; vii, x (natural)	1999	Located southwest of the Philippine archipelago. this 22,202-hectare site includes several karstic caves formed by limestones with various rock formations, and an 8.2-kilometer subterranean river, which flows to the sea. Because of this, its brackish lower part is prone to tides. With a variety of mountain and marine species, its waters and forests are a vital area for biodiversity conservation.
Mount Hamiguitan Range Wildlife Sanctuary		Davao Oriental, Davao	1403rev; x (natural)	2014	Located southeast of the Eastern Mindanao Biodiversity Corridor, Hamiguitan rises up to 1,637 meters above sea level. There are 1,380 species; of all those deemed threatened and endemic, eight are exclusive to Hamiguitan. Threatened fauna include the Mindanao bleeding-heart and Philippine warty pig; critically endangered fauna include the Philippine eagle and cockatoo; critically endangered flora include the Shorea polysperma and Shorea astylosa.

== Tentative list ==
In addition to sites inscribed on the World Heritage List, member states can maintain a list of tentative sites that they may consider for nomination. Nominations for the World Heritage List are only accepted if the site was previously listed on the tentative list. The Philippines 25 properties on its tentative list.

World Heritage Sites
Site	Image	Location (region)	UNESCO criteria	Year listed	Description
Batanes Protected Landscapes and Seascapes		Batanes	(cultural)	1993	The Mahatao Church of Batanes is a declared National Cultural Treasure of the Philippines. In 2003, the Batanes Protected Landscape and Seascape was nominated, but was deferred due to the lack of conservation in the islands at the time.
Northern Sierra Madre Natural Park and outlying areas inclusive of the buffer zone		Isabela	ix, x (natural)	2006	The site is the largest national park in the Philippines.
Mt. Iglit-Baco National Park		Mindoro	ix, x (natural)	2015	The site is a declared ASEAN Heritage Park.
Coron Island Natural Biotic Area		Palawan	iii, ix, x (mixed)	2006	The site is within the Palawan UNESCO Biosphere Reserve.
El Nido-Taytay Managed Resource Protected Area		Palawan	ix, x (natural)	2006	The site is within the Palawan UNESCO Biosphere Reserve.
Apo Reef Natural Park		Sulu Sea	vii, ix, x (natural)	2006	The site is the second biggest producer of juvenile marine fishes in the world, next only to the Tubbataha Reefs Natural Park.
Mt. Pulag National Park		Benguet, Ifugao, Nueva Vizcaya	ix, x (natural)	2006	The site is the third highest point in the Philippines.
Mt. Malindang Range Natural Park		Misamis Occidental	vii, ix, x (natural)	2006	The site is a declared ASEAN Heritage Park.
Chocolate Hills Natural Monument		Bohol	vii, viii (natural)	2006	The site is part of the Bohol Island UNESCO Global Geopark.
Baroque Churches of the Philippines (Extension)		Bohol, Cebu, Isabela, Samar, Siquijor	i, iii, iv, v, vi (cultural)	2006	All five baroque churches (located in Boljoon, Guiuan, Lazi, Loboc and Tumauini) have been declared as National Cultural Treasures of the Philippines.
Butuan Archeological Sites		Agusan del Norte	iii, iv, v (cultural)	2006	The site exemplified and concretized the capability of the pre-Hispanic Rajahnate of Butuan as a nation with great expertise in boat-making, seafaring, and gold manufacturing.
The Tabon Cave Complex and all of Lipuun		Palawan	ii, iii, iv, v (cultural)	2006	The site is a declared National Cultural Treasure of the Philippines due to the Tabon Man discovery in the area. It was listed by the World Monuments Fund.
Turtle Islands Wildlife Sanctuary		Tawi-Tawi	ix, x (natural)	2015	The site is a major green sea turtle breeding and hatchery zone in the Asia-Pacific.
Mayon Volcano Natural Park		Albay	vii, x (natural)	2015	The site is the central property of the Albay UNESCO Biosphere Reserve.Initially, it was set for declaration by 2020, but canceled after government failed to submit the site documents on time.
Mt. Mantalingajan Protected Landscape		Palawan	ix, x (natural)	2015	The site is part of the Palawan UNESCO Biosphere Reserve.
Mount Hamiguitan Range Wildlife Sanctuary (Extension) - Pujada Bay		Davao Oriental	x (natural)	2024	Pujada Bay is adjacent to the Mt. Hamiguitan Range Wildlife Sanctuary (MHRWS), the only World Heritage site on Mindanao Island and an ASEAN Heritage Park. Pujada Bay is a significant natural habitat for endemic, migratory, charismatic, keystone, and threatened species.
Rice Terraces of the Philippine Cordilleras (Extension)		Ifugao	iii, iv, v (cultural)	2024	The Rice Terraces of the Philippine Cordilleras is an outstanding example of an evolved, living cultural landscape that can be traced as far back as two millennia ago in the pre-colonial Philippines.
Prehistoric Sites of the Cagayan Valley Basin		Cagayan, Kalinga	v (cultural)	2024	The Cagayan Valley Basin encompasses extensive and crucial prehistoric archaeological significance which has a central role in the thriving existence of hominin species and their cultural traditions for the last 700 thousand years.
Samar Island Natural Park		Northern Samar, Samar	vii, ix, x (natural)	2024	Samar Island Natural Park is a lowland forest reserve, home to the largest tract of relatively intact lowland forest in the Philippines and a rich population of dipterocarp species.
Corregidor Island and Historic Fortifications of Manila Bay		Cavite	iv, vi (cultural)	2024	Corregidor Island and the Historic Fortifications of Manila Bay is an outstanding complex of fortifications at the mouth of the Manila Bay. It witnessed early globalization through the Galleon Trade and the subsequent fight for democracy and human dignity in Asia-Pacific during World War II.
Kitanglad and Kalatungan Mountain Ranges: Sacred Sites of Bukidnon		Bukidnon	iii, ix, x (mixed)	2024	The Nominated Areas, Mt. Kitanglad Range Natural Park (MKRNP) and Mt. Kalatungan Range Natural Park (MKaRNP) are recognized as Key Biodiversity Area (KBA) and Important Bird Areas. MKRNP and MKaRNP are also the sacred domains of the Bukidnon, Talaandig, Higaonon, and Manobo tribes.
Agusan Marsh Wildlife Sanctuary		Agusan del Sur	ix, x (natural)	2024	The Agusan Marsh Wildlife Sanctuary serves as a vital refuge for lowland forest biodiversity, safeguarding the largest expanses of swamp forests remaining in the Philippines.
Colonial Urban Plan and Fortifications of the Walled City of Manila		City of Manila	ii, iv (cultural)	2024	The Historic Centre of Manila documents, in its built environment, an exemplary example of development in town planning and architecture, demonstrating an amalgamation and important interchange of several ideas over the Age of Colonization and the Early Modern Era.
The Historic Towns and Landscape of Taal Volcano and its Caldera Lake		Batangas, Cavite	ii, ix (mixed)	2024	The towns of the landscape – particularly in Taal – demonstrate the blending of different cultures as a result of colonization in architecture and urban planning, reflected in grand houses and places of worship, including the largest church in Asia, the Basilica of St. Martin of Tours, and underscore the richness of the agriculture of the area, and the intangible heritage of its products of Barako (coffee), Burda (embroidery), and Barong.
The Sugar Cultural Landscape of Negros and Panay Islands		Antique, Capiz, Guimaras, Iloilo, Negros Occidental, Negros Oriental	ii (cultural)	2024	The nominated areas and properties include old sugarcane haciendas, active, and non-active sugar mills over a century-old, town centers that developed and architecturally distinct mansions were built, showcasing the wealth derived from sugarcane cultivation and trade.

== See also ==
- List of Memory of the World Documentary Heritage in the Philippines
- List of Intangible Cultural Heritage elements in the Philippines
- List of protected areas of the Philippines
- Intangible Cultural Heritage of the Philippines
- Lists of Cultural Properties of the Philippines
- List of national parks of the Philippines
- Biosphere reserves of the Philippines
- List of Ramsar sites in the Philippines
