= Biosphere reserves of the Philippines =

Biosphere reserves are areas comprising terrestrial, marine and coastal ecosystems. The biosphere reserve title is handed over by UNESCO. Each reserve promotes solutions reconciling the conservation of biodiversity with its sustainable use. Biosphere reserves are 'Science for Sustainability support sites' – special places for testing interdisciplinary approaches to understanding and managing changes and interactions between social and ecological systems, including conflict prevention and management of biodiversity. Biosphere reserves are nominated by national governments and remain under the sovereign jurisdiction of the states where they are located. Their status is internationally recognized.

== History ==
=== Early activities (1977–2000) ===
In 1977, the Puerto Galera Biosphere Reserve was inscribed in the UNESCO World Network of Biosphere Reserves. During that time, countries who have yet to ratify the UNESCO Convention were allowed to nominate sites in the biosphere reserve network. However, UNESCO participation of the Philippines was extremely limited due to the brutal Marcos dictatorship.

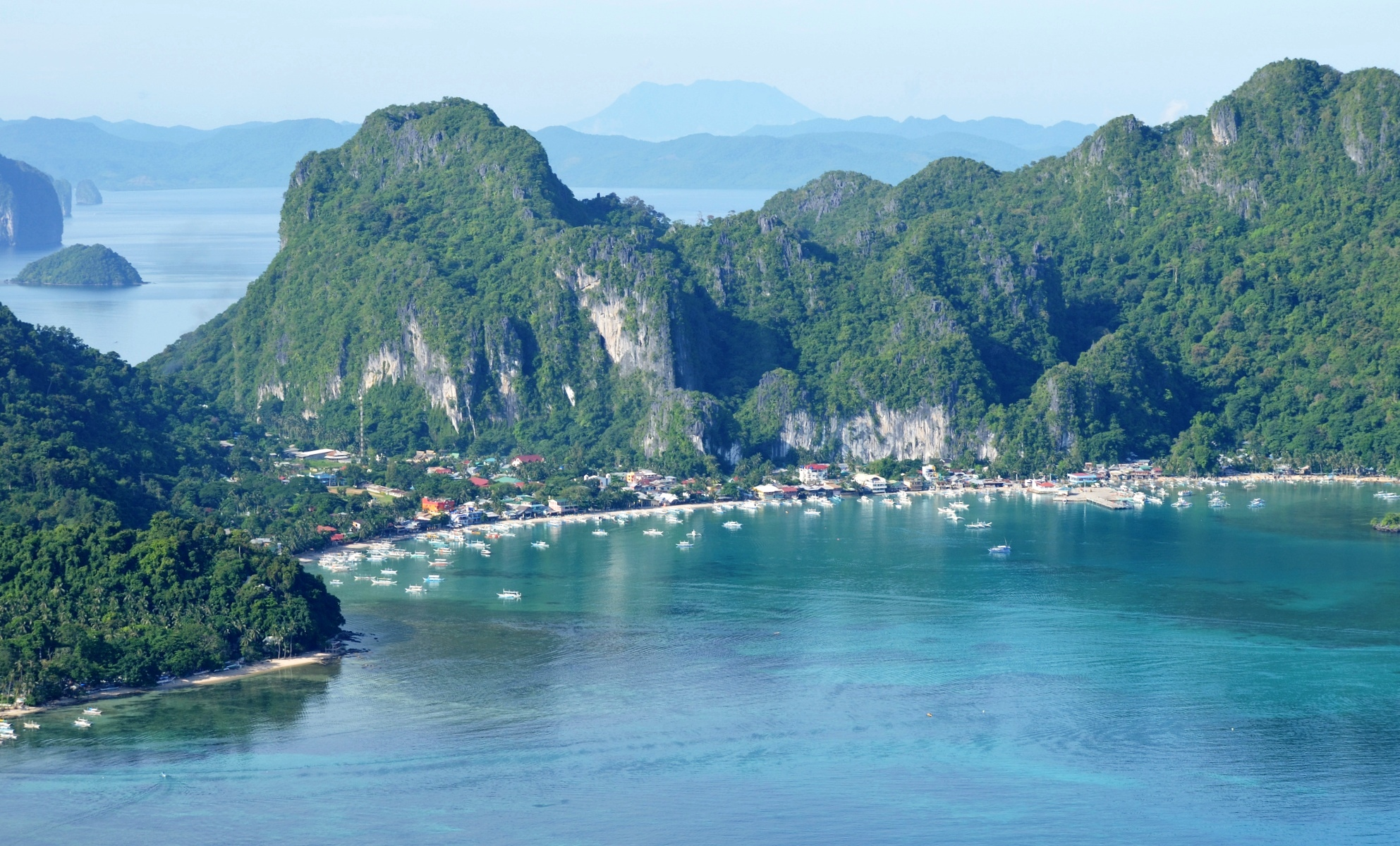
The Palawan Biosphere Reserve was inscribed in the UNESCO World Network of Biosphere Reserves in 1990.

The Philippines ratified the UNESCO Convention on September 19, 1985, effectively becoming a member of the organization on the same date. However, activities concerning UNESCO nominations were only made after the successful People Power Revolution of 1986, which restored democracy in the Southeast Asian nation. UNESCO activities and preparations came afterwards under the support of President Corazon Aquino and notably through staunch heritage conservationist and architect, Augusto Villalón, who UNESCO hails as "one of Asia’s most renowned experts in heritage conservation" and "the father of heritage conservation in the Philippines". In 1990, the Aquino administration partnered with UNESCO for the International Literacy Year programme. On the same year, the Palawan Biosphere Reserve was inscribed in the UNESCO World Network of Biosphere Reserves. In 1991, the Philippines under President Corazon Aquino won a mandate to the World Heritage Committee, serving until 1997, the first time the Philippines had a role in the powerful UNESCO committee.

From 1993 to 1999, five UNESCO sites, spanning nine locations, were inscribed in the UNESCO World Heritage List through the initiative of the Philippine government and Villalón's Heritage Conservation Society. These sites included the Baroque Churches of the Philippines (1993), Tubbataha Reefs Natural Park (1993), Rice Terraces of the Philippine Cordilleras (1995), Historic City of Vigan (1999), and the Puerto-Princesa Subterranean River National Park (1999). In 1994, the Olango Island Wildlife Sanctuary was declared as a Ramsar wetland site under the Ramsar Convention of UNESCO. In 1995, the Philippines hosted UNESCO's "Regional Thematic Study Meeting on Asian Rice Culture and its Terraced Landscape" in the capital, Manila. In 1997, the Philippines participated in the "Asia-Pacific World Heritage Youth Forum" held in China and the "Asia-Pacific Heritage Site Managers' Workshop" held in Thailand. Villalón afterwards retired from the UNESCO Commission in 1999. The National Museum nominated the Philippine Paleographs (Hanunoo, Build, Tagbanua and Pala'wan) in 1999 to the UNESCO Memory of the World Register and was inscribed on the same year, becoming the first international documentary heritage coming from the Philippines. Additionally, three sites, namely, Naujan Lake National Park, Tubbataha Reefs Natural Park, and Agusan Marsh Wildlife Sanctuary, were declared as Ramsar wetland sites under the Ramsar Convention of UNESCO.

=== Pre-Heritage Act decade (2001–2010) ===
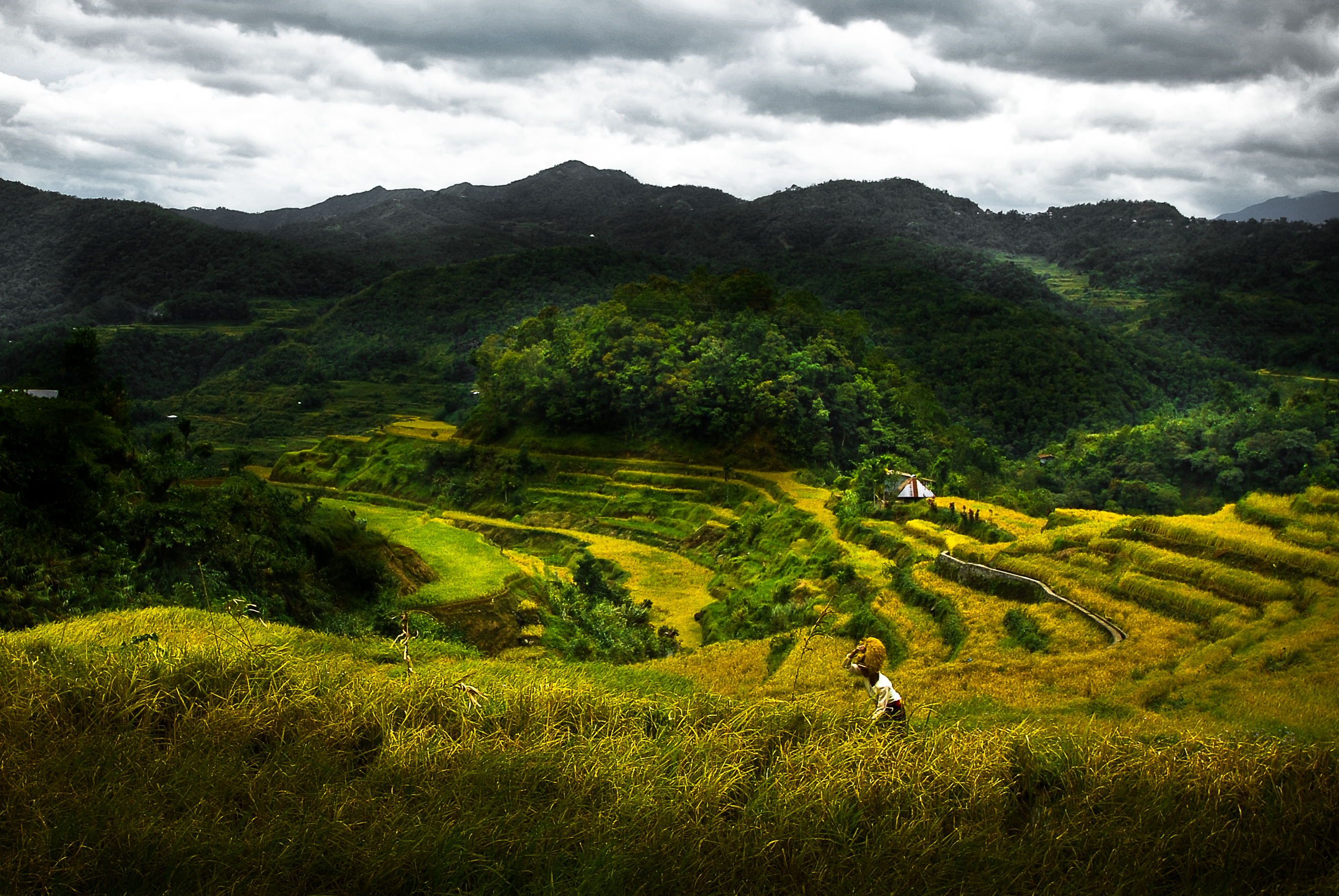
A woman chanting the Hudhud while harvesting. The Hudhud Chants of the Ifugao was declared as one of the Eleven Masterpieces of the Oral and Intangible Heritage of Humanity in 2001, and later inscribed in the UNESCO Intangible Cultural Heritage Lists in 2008.

In 2001, the Heritage Conservation Society started its appeal to the officials of Batanes to establish conservation programs for a possible UNESCO inscription as the Batanes Protected landscapes and seascapes has been a UNESCO tentative site in 1993. On the same year, the Hudhud chant of the Ifugao was declared as one of the Eleven Masterpieces of the Oral and Intangible Heritage of Humanity. However, UNESCO also enlisted the Rice Terraces of the Philippine Cordilleras in the List of Sites in Danger, prompting local officials to initiate a province-wide conservation program for the terraces. Before the year ended, the Nelson Tower was named as an Honourable Mention in the UNESCO Asia Pacific Heritage Awards.

In 2003, Radio Veritas Asia, Raja Broadcasting Network, and Punzalan Personal Archives nominated the Radio Broadcast of the Philippine People Power Revolution in the UNESCO Memory of the World Register. The nomination was inscribed on the same year. Additionally, the Gota de Leche Building was named as an Honourable Mention in the UNESCO Asia Pacific Heritage Awards.

Additionally, the country nominated Batanes to the world heritage list, but it was deferred by UNESCO due to lack of conservation. The site officially was put in deferred status in 2005. In 2005, the Darangen epic chant of the Maranao was declared as a Masterpiece of the Oral and Intangible Heritage of Humanity. On the same year, the Far Eastern University was named as an Honourable Mention in the UNESCO Asia Pacific Heritage Awards.

In December 2005, the Philippines participated in the UNESCO Regional Workshop on Periodic Reporting Follow-up for North-East and South-East Asia, held in Malaysia. The country also participated in the Seeing with Young Eyes – Teacher Training Workshop of UNESCO in 2006, which was also conducted in Vigan in 2001. In August 2007, the "Living Landscapes and Cultural Landmarks: World Heritage Sites in the Philippines" was launched by Villalón. On the same year, the Batanes nomination was put in "referred status", pending for the dossier to be submitted by the local Ivatan authorities.

In 2007, the U.P. Center for Ethnomusicology nominated the José Maceda Collection to the UNESCO Memory of the World Register. The documentary heritage was inscribed on the same year. In 2008, the UNESCO Intangible Cultural Heritage Lists were established; both the Hudhud chant of the Ifugao and the Darangen epic chant of the Maranao were inscribed on the same year.

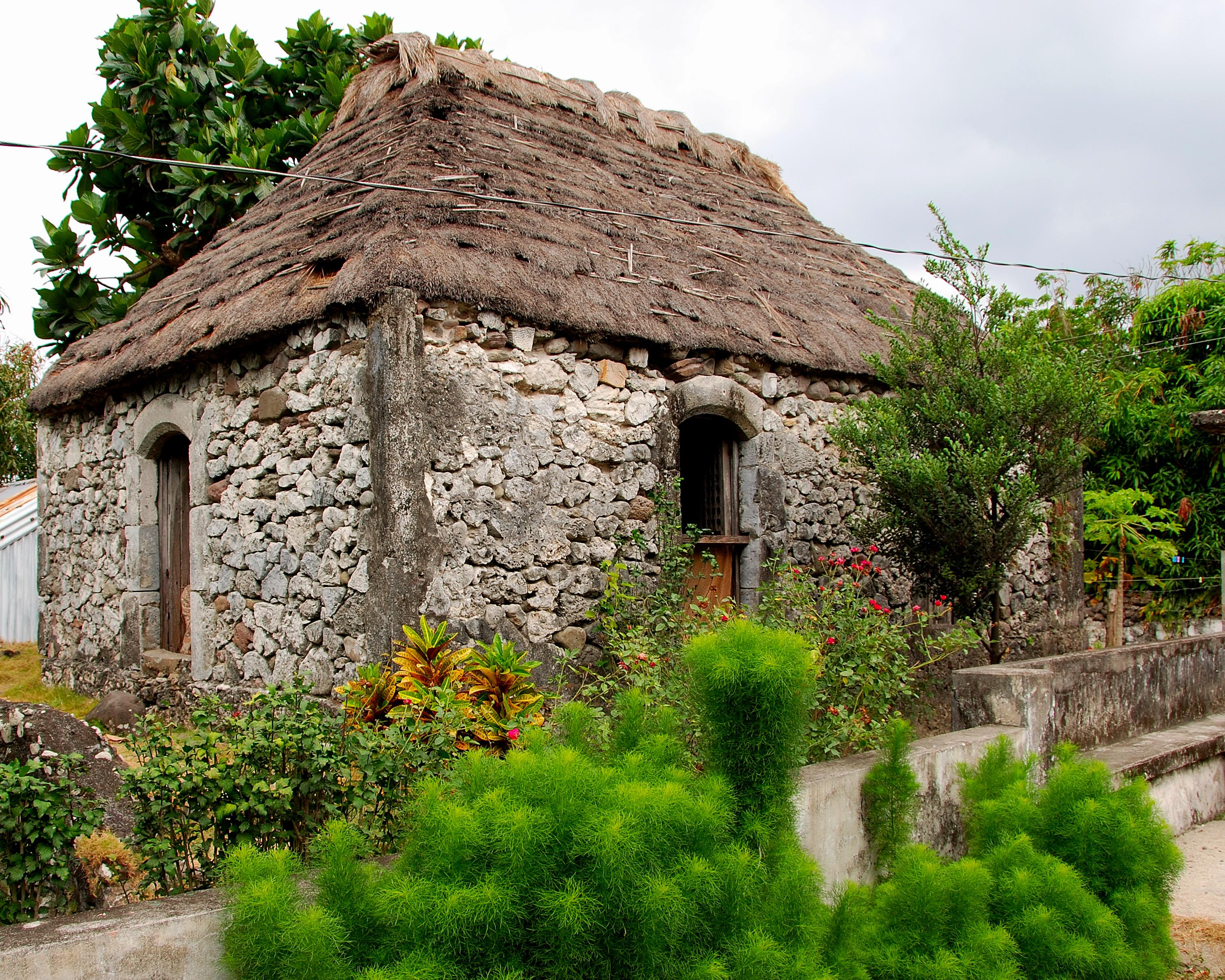
An old coral-stone house in Batanes, a UNESCO tentative site.

Middle of 2008, all the documents were ready except for the Batanes dossier. UNESCO set early 2010 as the deadline for the dossier for site inscription, however, the local officials of Batanes failed to make a dossier, and thus, the site was officially taken out from referred status. Due to this, the nomination reverted to zero. This failure led the Heritage Conservation Society to focus on the nomination of Davao Oriental's Mount Hamiguitan Range Wildlife Sanctuary, which became a UNESCO World Heritage Site in 2014. In September 2008, the Philippines participated in the "Workshop for the World Heritage property of Lumbini, the birthplace of Lord Buddha" held in Nepal. In 2009, the boundaries of Tubbataha Reefs Natural Park was expanded.

In April 2010, the Philippines participated in the "Sub-regional Workshop on the second cycle of Periodic Reporting in Asia and the Pacific" held in China. In late 2010, conservationists from the Heritage Conservation Society went to Batanes again to initiate a second nomination attempt. The organization found that non-traditional concrete structures were being established by locals in various sections of the islands, effectively diminishing the site's cultural value. The society appealed to the local government to stop the non-traditional buildings, but the local government retaliated against the conservationists. A report noted that traditional Ivatan houses were being converted into hollow block houses for the benefit of local politicians. In 2011, the government of Batanes formally nominated their province in UNESCO, but failed due to lack of cultural protections, lack of a holistic dossier, and the establishment of non-traditional buildings which have been approved by the provincial and municipal governments of Batanes at the time. Prompted by failures of past officials, the local governments of Batanes afterwards converged and declared a province-wide cultural and natural conservation program. The National Museum of the Philippines initiated the establishment of a branch museum in the province to preserve Ivatan heritage. The Heritage Conservation Society and National Commission for Culture and the Arts aided the conservation programs led by the Ivatan officials. The Philippine government has stated that once all conservation programs are deemed successful and fulfilled, the Philippines will again nominate Batanes to the UNESCO world heritage list.

=== Heritage Act enacted (2010–2016) ===
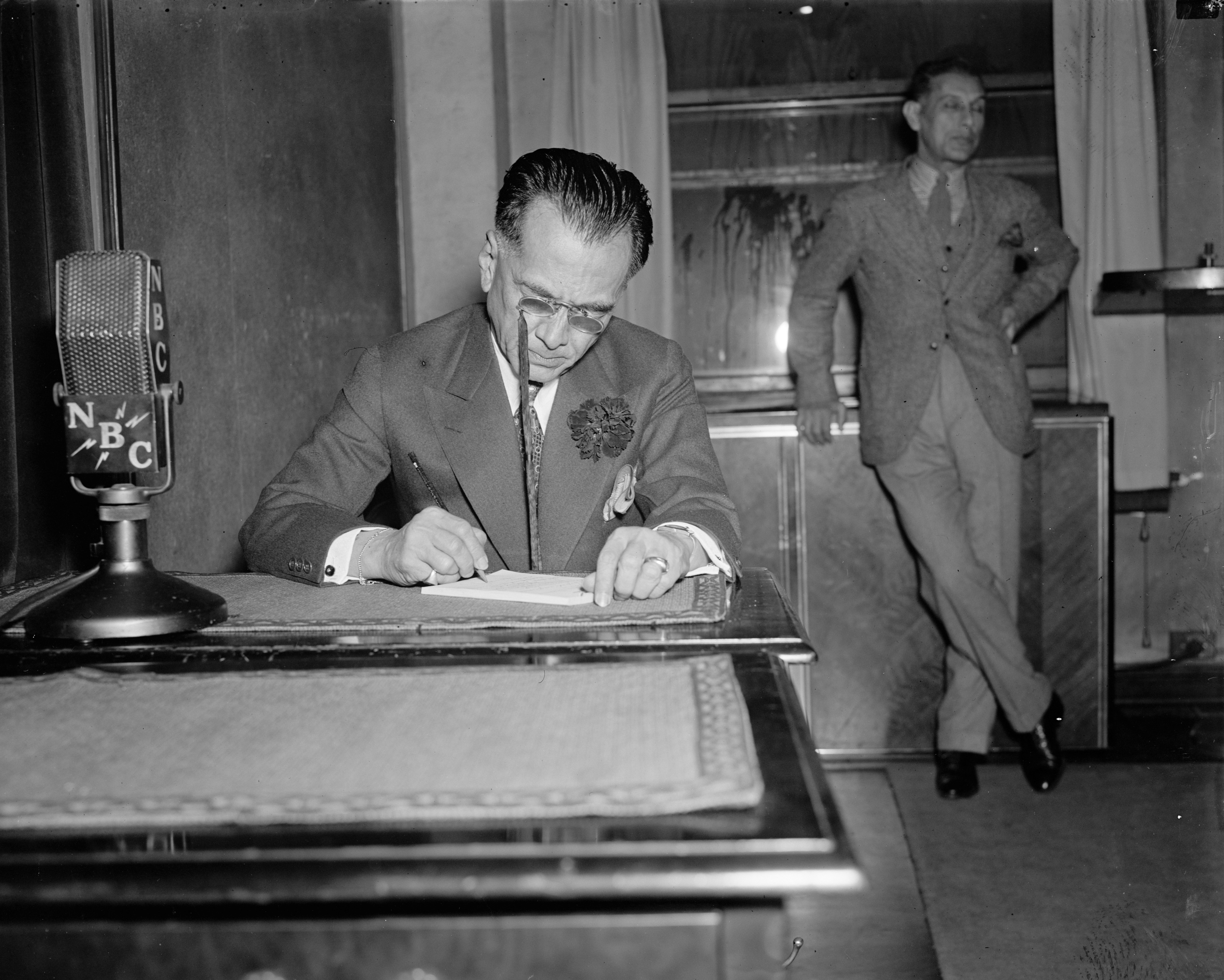
The Presidential Papers of Manuel L. Quezon were inscribed in the UNESCO Memory of the World International Register in 2011.

On April 10, 2010, the National Cultural Heritage Act (Republic Act No. 10066) formally came into effect. The law created the Philippine Registry of Cultural Property and took other steps to conserve, preserve, and restore Filipino cultural properties. In October 2011, two typhoons severely damaged the UNESCO-inscribed Rice Terraces in Ifugao, prompting a massive rehabilitation program. In 2011, the University of Michigan Library in partnership with the Philippine government nominated the Presidential Papers of Manuel L. Quezon. They were added to the UNESCO Memory of the World International Register.

In mid-2011, the Philippines participated in the UNITAR Series on the Management and Conservation of World Heritage Sites with a theme of "Preparing World Heritage Nominations: Continuity and Change within UNESCO's New Manual". The country was represented by the Heritage Conservation Society, the Batanes government, and the National Museum of the Philippines. Three factors were cited for the lack of world heritage declarations in the Philippines, namely, (1) the lack of awareness about UNESCO World Heritage among local stakeholders, especially the indigenous communities, local governments and residents that live around these potential sites, (2) the absence of competent people who are fully aware of the processes involved in preparing and providing the correct documents for nomination as World Heritage, and (3) the lack of government funding to prepare and support these nominations, among many others. It was also noted that describing a nominated property as "unique" is the worst argument one could give for UNESCO nomination as all sites are not unique and there are always similar properties it can be compared with. The Outstanding Universal Value (OUV) based on at least one of the ten criteria should be clearly established as well, according to UNESCO. According to UNESCO, the most important part of the nomination is the comparative analysis of the site as extensive comparison with other similar properties is vital to prove OUV and push nomination forward. Due to this, the Filipino delegations acknowledged the need to rewrite the dossier for Batanes, as it had been rejected before due to lacking information for an actual nomination to be accepted by UNESCO. Due to these findings, the Philippine government would later establish three legs for the UNESCO Pamana (Heritage) Workshop from 2016 to 2017 for the tentative sites and possible tentative sites of the country.

By November 2011, the Batangas government proposed to establish a "Hollywood sign" on top of the Taal Volcano, which at the time was a UNESCO tentative site, receiving criticism. The government later retracted the proposal. In March 2012, the Swiss-based Jaeger-LeCoultre initiated an auction which benefited the conservation programs for the Puerto-Princesa Subterranean River National Park. In June 2012, the Rice Terraces of the Philippine Cordilleras was officially removed from the list of UNESCO World Heritage Sites in Danger, marking the country's most successful cultural landscape rehabilitation achievement. In the same month, the Puerto Princesa Subterranean River National Park was declared as a Ramsar wetland site under the Ramsar Convention of UNESCO. In September 2012, the Philippines participated in the "Joint International Symposium: Involving Communities for Better Conservation and Management of Asian World Heritage Sites" held in South Korea. In October 2012, the Tubbataha Reefs Natural Park won the Future Policy Award for marine resource management, the first Philippine site to receive the prestigious international conservation award. On the same month, the Heritage City of Vigan was recognized for "best practice in World Heritage Site management." The country also participated in the "Doha Climate Change Conference".

In 2013, the Philippines under President Noynoy Aquino won its second mandate to the powerful World Heritage Committee, serving until 2017. In January of the same year, an American vessel ran aground in the Tubbataha Reefs Natural Park. The United States government afterwards paid 87 million pesos in compensation. In March 2013, the Las Piñas-Parañaque Critical Habitat and Ecotourism Area was declared as a Ramsar wetland site under the Ramsar Convention of UNESCO. In June 2013, the Philippines participated in the "International World Heritage Youth Forum: Living with Heritage: Temple, Environment and People (T.E.P.)" held in Cambodia. On the same month, the country aided in the UNESCO publication of the "Beach Forest Species and Mangrove Associates in the Philippines", and also participated in the discussions on culture and education for the incoming 2015 Development Agenda, as well as the goodwill ambassadorial meeting. In May 2013, the Philippines participated in the UNESCO publication of the "Best Practices of Island and Coastal Biosphere Reserves." On the same month, a Chinese vessel crashed in the Tubbataha Reefs Natural Park, destroying approximately 3,902 square meters (42,000 square feet) of coral. Additionally, brutally-killed endangered pangolins from the Palawan Biosphere Reserve were inside the Chinese ship. Pangolins are protected under Philippine laws and the international treaty, CITES, where the Philippines is a signatory. Later that month, the Philippines participated in the testing of the Pacific tsunami warning system backed by UNESCO.

In September 2013, the Philippines launched the "Pamana: World Heritage in the Philippines" funded by UNESCO. In October 2013, the Philippines participated in the Budapest Water Summit. On the same month, the 7.2-magnitude Central Visayas earthquake damaged and destroyed numerous cultural properties in the Philippines. Three weeks later, in November 2013, Typhoon Haiyan, the most powerful typhoon of the century, hit the country, destroying and damaging more heritage sites. UNESCO expressed its condolences to the Philippines and pledged support for the victims. President Aquino afterwards launched the national government's programs to preserve and restore all heritage sites damaged by natural calamities including those declared as UNESCO world heritage sites, while also launching the establishment, expansion and modernization of more museums throughout the country, including the National Museum of the Philippines, which houses UNESCO-inscribed documentary collections. On the same month, the Philippines was elected in the World Heritage Committee, and participated in the ESD Awareness meetings held for journalists around the world. In December 2013, UNESCO signed a Cooperation Agreement with the Philippines and other state members of ASEAN. In early 2014, the faithful restoration of the sites began, and would continue for approximately one decade.

In August 2014, the Philippines participated in the UNESCO and IKMAS Roundtable for the improvement of inclusive policy approaches and data gaps in ASEAN. In April 2014, the Philippines participated in the "UNESCO Asia Pacific World Heritage Project on Marine Biodiversity & Climate Change Awareness among Youth" held in New Caledonia, as well as the UNESCO Social Inclusion Policies meeting. Afterwards, the National Commission for Culture and the Arts launched the Sagisag Kultura, a long-term cultural mapping program that lists and discusses the cultural icons of the Philippines, both intangible and tangible, living and non-living. In June 2014, the Mount Hamiguitan Range Wildlife Sanctuary was inscribed in the UNESCO World Heritage List, becoming the sixth world heritage site of the country since the country's last inscription in 1999. On the same month, the Philippines participated in the Young Scientists and Michel Batisse Awards, where the Filipino delegation was awarded for biodiversity conservation. In August 2014, the Philippines hosted UNESCO and its international delegations to the World Heritage Volunteer Programme, held in Ifugao province. In June 2014, the Philippines hosted UNESCO's Global Network of Island and Coastal Biosphere Reserves, held in Palawan. In November 2014, UNESCO applauded the Philippines for adopting an open licensing and MOOCs for the University of the Philippines, one of the only five universities in Southeast Asia to do so. In November 2014, the Philippines participated in the launching of the "New Guide - Promoting Disaster Risk Reduction through Education" for the benefit of climate vulnerable nations. On the same month, the Philippines participated in the "UN Plan of Action on the Safety of Journalists and the Issue of Impunity". In December 2014, the Philippines participated in the "Asia Rounds of the Price Media Law Moot Court Competition" held in Beijing. In 2015, Balanga was declared as the country's first UNESCO Learning City by the UNESCO Institute for Lifelong Learning. On March 20, 2015, the UNESCO Tentative List of the Philippines was revised after recommendations from the UNESCO due to changes within the proposed sites, notably due to human causes and natural causes such as the 2013 central Philippines typhoon-earthquake. Among the sites that were removed from the tentative list were Taal Volcano Protected Landscape, Panglao Island, Mount Apo Natural Park, Maragondon Church, San Sebastian Church (Manila), Baclayon Church, Spanish Colonial Fortifications of the Philippines, Agusan Marsh Wildlife Sanctuary, Liguasan Marsh, Mount Matutum Protected Landscape, Mount Kitanglad, and Mount Kalatungan. In April 2015, a new management plan was launched for Tubbataha Reefs Natural Park which focuses on the site's "Outstanding Universal Value".

In May 2015, the Philippines applied for better protection for marine World Heritage Sites at the UNESCO-affiliated International Maritime Organisation. In August 2015, the Philippine Heritage Map was launched by Arches, Getty Conservation Institute, World Monuments Fund, National Commission for Culture and the Arts, National Museum of the Philippines, and the National Historical Commission of the Philippines. On the same month, the Philippines participated in the UNESCO-initiated World Heritage Volunteers 2015 Action Camps. In September 2015, the Philippines participated in the "10th International Training Programme on Disaster Risk Management of Cultural Heritage" held in Japan. In December 2015, the Punnuk – tugging ritual of the Ifugao was included in Tugging Rituals and Games of the UNESCO Intangible Cultural Heritage Lists.

In January 2016, the Philippines participated in the international dialogue on "Understanding rights practices in the World Heritage system: lessons from the Asia-Pacific and the global area" held in Switzerland. In March 2016 the Albay Biosphere Reserve was inscribed in the UNESCO World Network of Biosphere Reserves. On the same month, the Aquino government successful restored various heritage sites, including churches, that were destroyed by calamities in 2013. Some sites in Cebu were turned over to their proper caretakers, while the remaining continued to undergo into each of their strategic restoration programs. On April 14–15, 2016, the first leg of the UNESCO Pamana (Heritage) Workshop of the Philippine government was administered in Puerto Princesa, Palawan. In the same month, the International Maritime Organization approved “in principle” the "Particularly Sensitive Sea Area Status" for Tubbataha Reefs Natural Park.

In June 2016, the Heritage Conservation Society and the United States embassy conducted a cultural-tourism program for the Agusan Marsh Wildlife Sanctuary, a step closer for the site's re-submission in the UNESCO tentative list. On September 15–16, 2016, the second part of the UNESCO Pamana (Heritage) Workshop was administered in Mati, Davao Oriental. In October 2016, the Negros Occidental Coastal Wetlands Conservation Area was declared as a Ramsar wetland site under the Ramsar Convention of UNESCO.

=== Present prospects (2017–present) ===
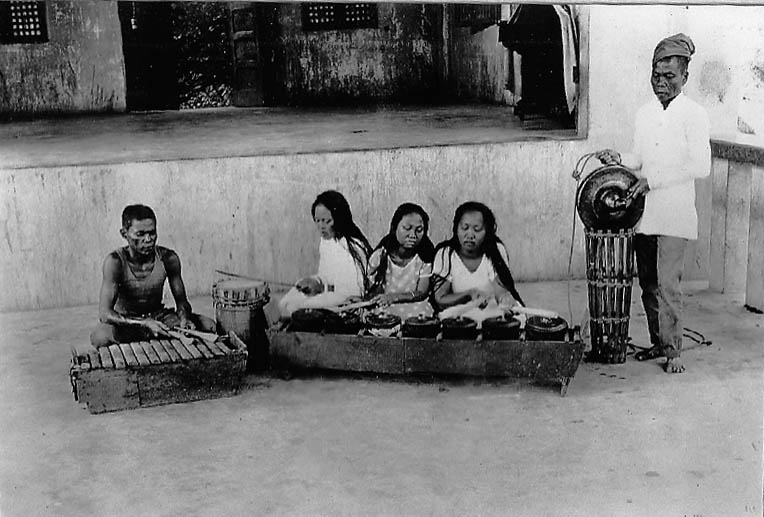
The Culion Leprosy Archives was inscribed in the Memory of the World Committee for Asia and the Pacific Regional Register in 2018, a step closer to a UNESCO Memory of the World Register inscription.

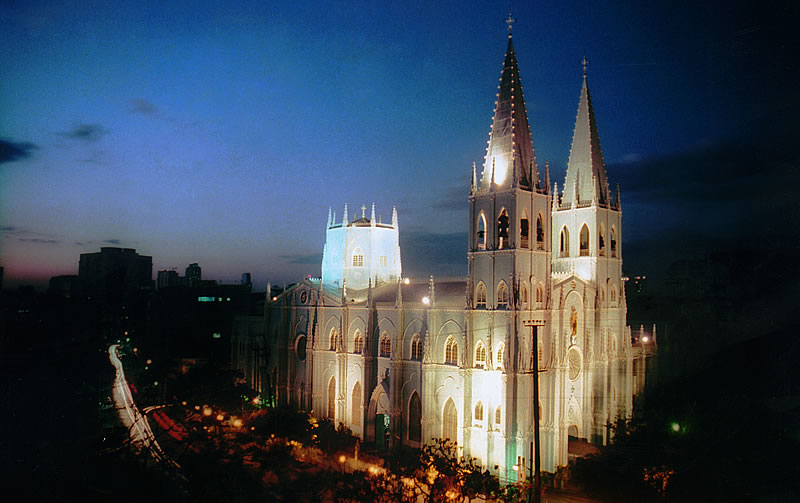
The San Sebastian Church (Manila) is threatened by a planned highrise building to be constructed by Summithome Realty Corporation.

In January 2017, Nickelodeon announced an underwater resort within the UNESCO tentative site of Coron Natural Biotic Area, which is also part of the Palawan Biosphere Reserve, receiving criticism from various sectors and majority of Coron residents. The planned resort was later aborted in August 2017. On March 23–24, the third and final leg of the UNESCO Pamana (Heritage) Workshop was administered in Legazpi City, Albay on March 23–24, 2017. In May 2017, the Philippines participated in the "UNESCO Expert Meeting for the World Heritage Nomination Process of the Maritime Silk Routes" held in the United Kingdom. In July 2017, the Tubbataha Reefs Natural Park was declared by UNESCO to have been protected from international shipping impacts. On the same month, the Philippines participated in the "World Heritage Young Professionals Forum 2017 " held in Poland. In September 2017, the Philippines participated in the "Capacity Building Workshop on Nature-Culture Linkages in Heritage Conservation in Asia and the Pacific" held in Japan. In October 2017, the Philippines participated in the "Photo Exhibit: Coral Reefs on UNESCO's World Heritage List" held in France. In November 2017, Baguio was declared as a "Creative City for Crafts and Folk Arts" and was inscribed in the UNESCO Creative Cities Network, becoming the country's first inscription in the network.

In 2018, the NCCA initiated a 3D laser scan program for all UNESCO cultural world heritage sites in the country as preparation for disasters in the future. The project ended in March 2018. On 30 May, the Culion Leprosy Archives was inscribed the UNESCO Memory of the World Committee for Asia and the Pacific (Mowcap), a step closer to the international memory list. In July 2018, the Philippines participated in the "2018 Capacity Building Workshop on Nature-Culture Linkages in Heritage Conservation in Asia and the Pacific" held in Japan. On October 1, 2018, it was revealed that a planned highrise building of Summithome Realty Corporation near San Sebastian Church had negatively affected the site's possible re-inclusion in the UNESCO tentative list, sparking criticism. On November 19, 2018, UNESCO warned the Philippines on the possible delisting of the Baroque Churches of the Philippines from the world heritage site due to a planned China-funded bridge approved by the Duterte government that would negatively impact the buffer zone of Manila's San Agustin Church. Despite receiving criticism, the government stated that the planned bridge will still commence. The bridge has staunchly been rejected by some officials of the NCCA.

In 2019, the CIPDH-UNESCO launched the #MemoriasSituadas project, which maps sites of memory linked to serious human rights violations. The Bantayog ng mga Desaparecido of the Philippines was inscribed in the project. The monument honors the victims of the brutal Marcos dictatorship. In May 2019, an NCCA report noted that the bridge construction near Intramuros has stopped. The Filipino heritage community has disputed the reports as construction in the field is still ongoing up to the present. In December 2019, the Buklog, thanksgiving ritual system of the Subanen, was added to the UNESCO Intangible Cultural Heritage Lists. In October 2020, it was announced that 21 churches that were damaged or destroyed by Typhoon Yolanda and the 2013 Bohol earthquake were formally restored. The strategic restoration programs were initiatives of the previous Aquino government. In 2021, the Sasmuan Pampanga Coastal Wetlands was declared as a Ramsar Wetland Site. In May 2023, UNESCO declared Bohol as the country's first Global Geopark

== Reserves ==
The Philippines currently has three UNESCO Biosphere Reserves. The first Biosphere of the country was designated in 1977.

The Palawan Biosphere Reserve is the only biosphere reserve in the country that contains a Ramsar Wetland Site (Tubbataha Reefs Natural Park) and two UNESCO World Heritage Sites (Tubbataha Reefs National Park and the Puerto Princesa Subterranean River National Park)

The Philippines became a committee member of the Man and Biosphere Programme of UNESCO in 2016 and shall retain the position until 2019.

Biosphere Reserve	Year Designated	Periodic Review	Description	Image	References
Albay Biosphere Reserve	2016		The Albay Biosphere Reserve is located at the southern end of the Luzon Island of the Philippines, and covers some 250,000 hectares. The terrestrial elevation of the site culminates at 2,462 metres, while its marine part reaches a depth of 223 below sea level. The site's high conservation value is constituted, notably, by 182 terrestrial plant species, 46 of which are endemic. Its marine and coastal ecosystems comprise 12 species of mangrove, 40 species of seaweed or macro-algae, and 10 species of sea grass. Five of the world's seven species of marine turtles are also found in Albay. Agriculture is the main source of income in the area. The biosphere reserve is home to Mayon Volcano, which is listed in the tentative list for UNESCO World Heritage Sites.		
Palawan Biosphere Reserve	1990	2012	The Palawan Biosphere Reserve is a cluster of islands composed of one long main island and smaller groups of islands around it. The 1,150,800 hectares of the biosphere reserve include the entire Province of Palawan Island, which is the westernmost province of the Philippines. The biosphere reserve is home to the Puerto-Princesa Subterranean River National Park and the Tubattaha Reefs Natural Park, both are declared UNESCO World Heritage Sites. The reserve is also home to the El Nido-Taytay Managed Reserve, Mount Mantalangajan National Park, Coron Natural Biotic Area, and the Palawan Petrographs, all of which are in the Tentative List for UNESCO World Heritage Sites.		
Puerto Galera Biosphere Reserve	1977	2014	Puerto Galera Biosphere Reserve is situated on Mindoro Island, about 120 km south of Manila. Its 23,200 hectares make up the northern tip of Mindoro Island and are bounded to the north by the Verde Island Passage, to the west by the Camarong River and to the east by the municipality of San Teodoro.		

Ecological frontiers like Eastern Mindanao, Eastern Visayas, Sibuyan island, Western Panay, the Sierra Madre, Southern Mindanao, the Sulu Archipelago, and the Cordilleras are theoretically capable of standing as UNESCO Biosphere Reserves in the future, along with specific Key Biodiversity Areas (KBAs) designated by Haribon Foundation and the Department of Environment and Natural Resources. In comparison to the 3 biosphere reserve of the Philippines, Indonesia has 11 biosphere reserves, China has 33, India has 10, Iran has 11, Japan has 9, Kazakhstan has 8, South Korea has 5, Sri Lanka has 4, and Vietnam has 9. The Philippines is one of the 18 ecological hotpot countries of the world, containing more than 228 Key Biodiversity Areas (KBAs).

Albay is the latest to be added to UNESCO's World Network of Biosphere Reserves in 2016. The government plans to nominate reserves in the Philippines annually once its committee membership ends.

=== Reserves by Philippine regions ===
Exclusive UNESCO Biosphere reserved refer to reserved locating in a single community/region. Shared reserves refer to reserved with entries in multiple communities/regions.

Community	Exclusive reserves	Shared reserves
Ilocandia	—	—
Cordillera	—	—
Cagayan Valley	—	—
Central Luzon	—	—
Manila	—	—
Calabarzon	—	—
Mimaropa	2	—
Bicolandia	1	—
Western Visayas	—	—
Central Visayas	—	—
Eastern Visayas	—	—
Zamboanga	—	—
Northern Mindanao	—	—
Caraga	—	—
Davao	—	—
Soccsksargen	—	—
Bangsamoro	—	—

=== Proposed Reserves ===
On July 27, 2018, the provincial government of Apayao announced their intent to start the long process to declare the Calanasan rainforests as a protected area and a UNESCO Biosphere Reserve or World Heritage Site. The site is the stronghold of Philippine eagles in Luzon, the largest island in the Philippines. The province also noted that they have sent four of their personnel to train in the United States under the US Foreign Service to hasten the declaration of the site.

== See also ==
- List of World Heritage Sites in the Philippines
- List of Ramsar sites in the Philippines
- List of protected areas of the Philippines
