= Puerto Princesa Subterranean River National Park =

National park in the Philippines

- IUCN category III (natural monument or feature)
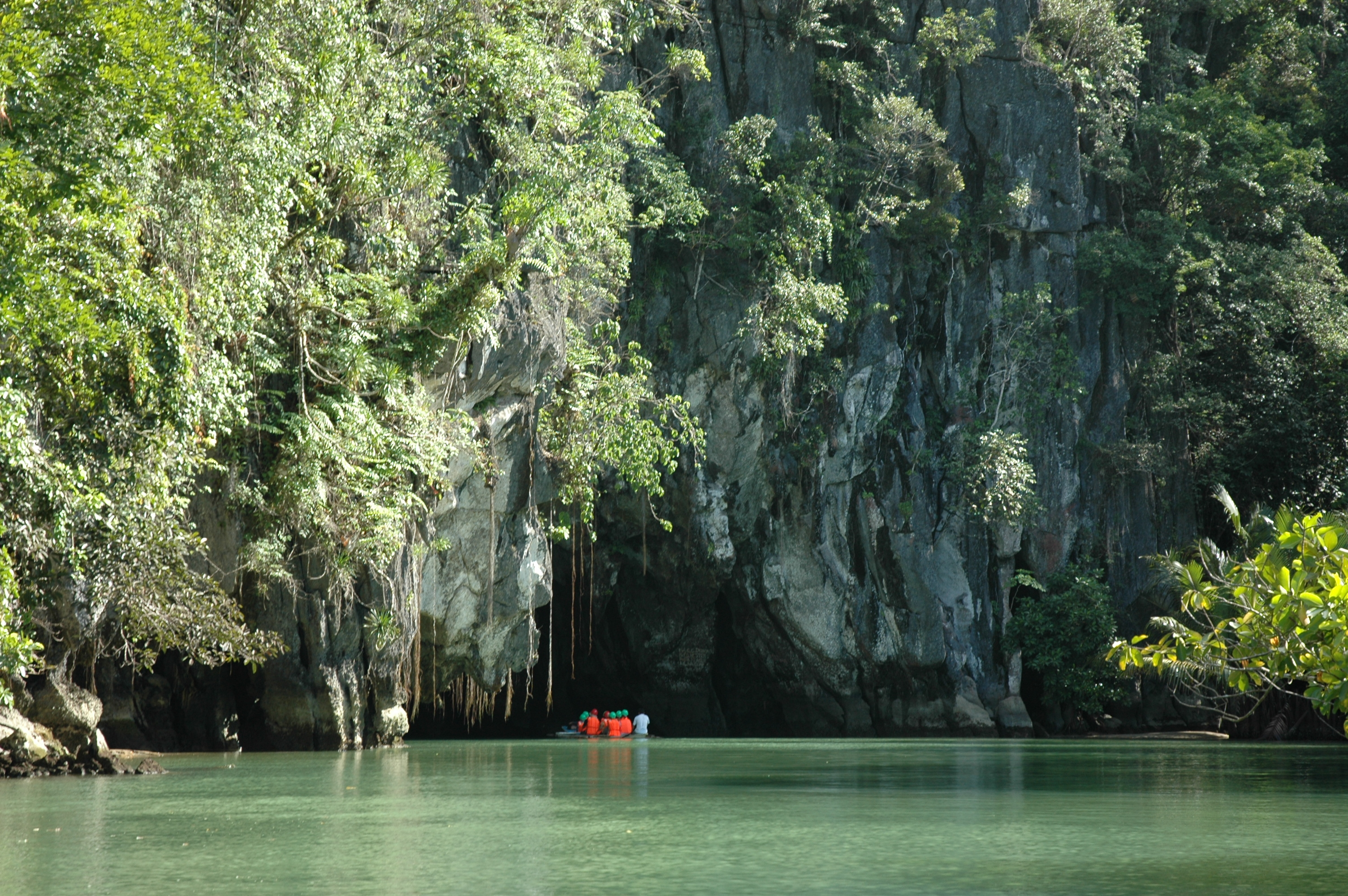
- Entrance to the Puerto Princesa Underground River

- Location within Palawan Location within Philippines
- Location: Palawan, Philippines
- Nearest city: Puerto Princesa
- Coordinates: 10°10′N 118°55′E
- Area: 22,202 hectares (54,860 acres)
- Established: November 12, 1999
- Governing body: Department of Environment and Natural Resources; City of Puerto Princesa

UNESCO World Heritage Site
- Type: Natural
- Criteria: vii, x
- Designated: 1999 (23rd session)
- Reference no.: 652rev
- Region: Asia-Pacific

Ramsar Wetland
- Designated: June 30, 2012
- Reference no.: 2084

The Puerto Princesa Subterranean River National Park is a protected area in the Philippines.

The park is located in the Saint Paul Mountain Range on the western coast of the island of Palawan, about 80 kilometers (50 mi) north of the city of Puerto Princesa, and contains the Puerto Princesa Subterranean River (also known as the Puerto Princesa Underground River or just Underground River). It has been managed by the Puerto Princesa city government since 1992.

It was listed as a UNESCO World Heritage Site in 1999, and voted as a New 7 Wonders of Nature in 2012. It also became a Ramsar Wetland Site in 2012.

A major tourist destination, it is mostly accessed through road trips to the seaside village of Sabang from where one of the many Bangkas (Kayaks) take visitors to the park.

== History ==
In 2010, a group of environmentalists and geologists discovered that the subterranean river has a second floor, which means that there are small waterfalls inside the cave. They also found a cave dome measuring 300 m (980 ft) above the underground river, rock formations, large bats, a deep water hole in the river, more river channels, and another deep cave, as well as marine creatures and more. Deeper areas of the underground river are almost impossible to explore due to oxygen deprivation.

On November 11, 2011, Puerto Princesa Underground River was provisionally chosen as one of the New 7 Wonders of Nature. This selection was officially confirmed on January 28, 2012.

== Geography ==
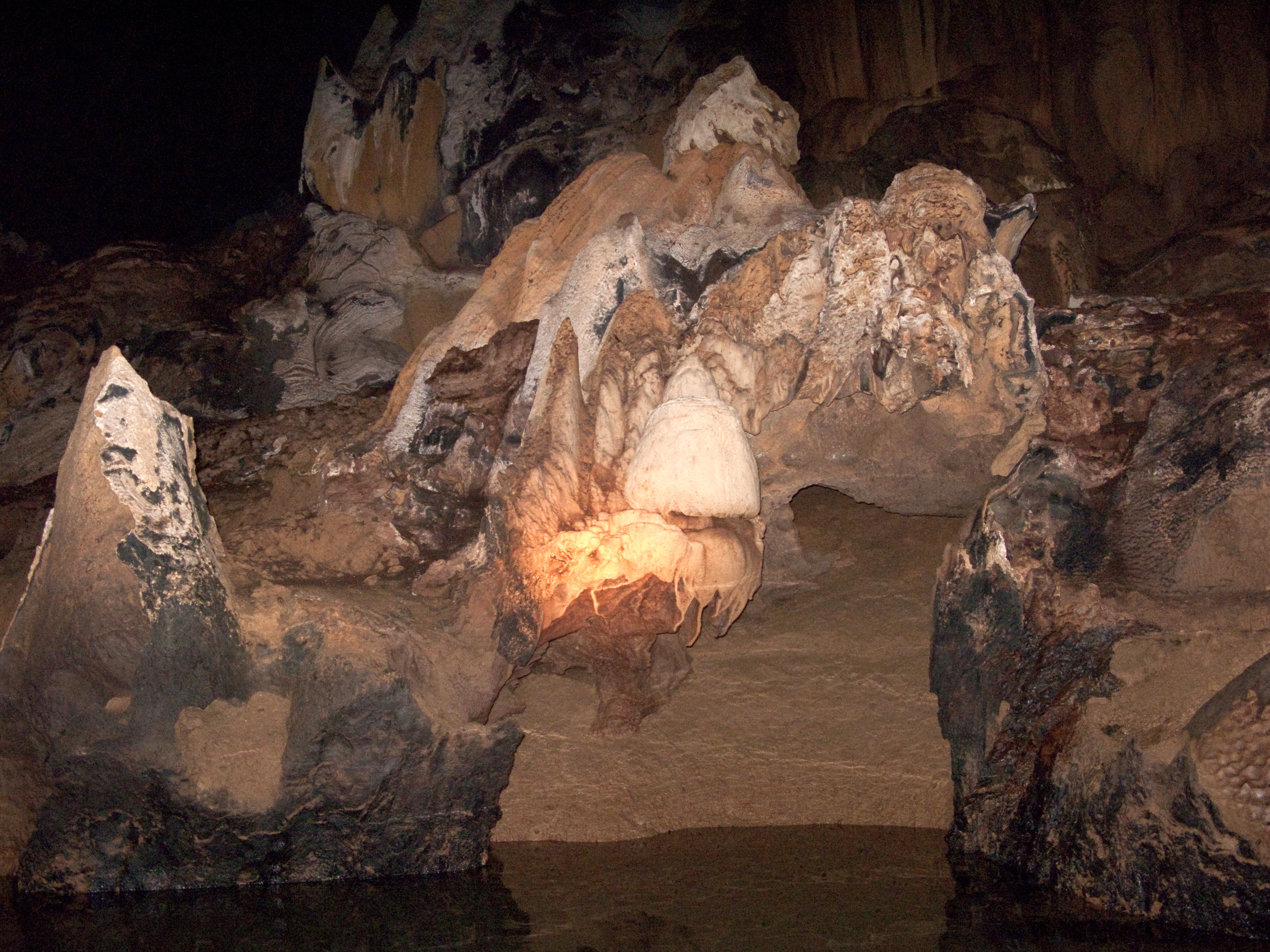
Cave and underground river

The Puerto Princesa Subterranean River is the second-longest underground river in the world. It consists of an 8.2 km (5.1 mi) underground section of the Cabayugan River, traversing a cave system that is at least 32 km (20 mi) long. The river winds through the caves before flowing directly into the South China Sea. Saltwater mixes with freshwater up to about 6 km (3.7 mi) inside the cave system. This creates a stratified water column, with the freshwater upper layer only a few centimeters thick. The stratification is absent during heavy rain, since flooding temporarily sweeps away the seawater. The river is navigable by boat up to 4.3 kilometres (2.7 mi) from the sea.

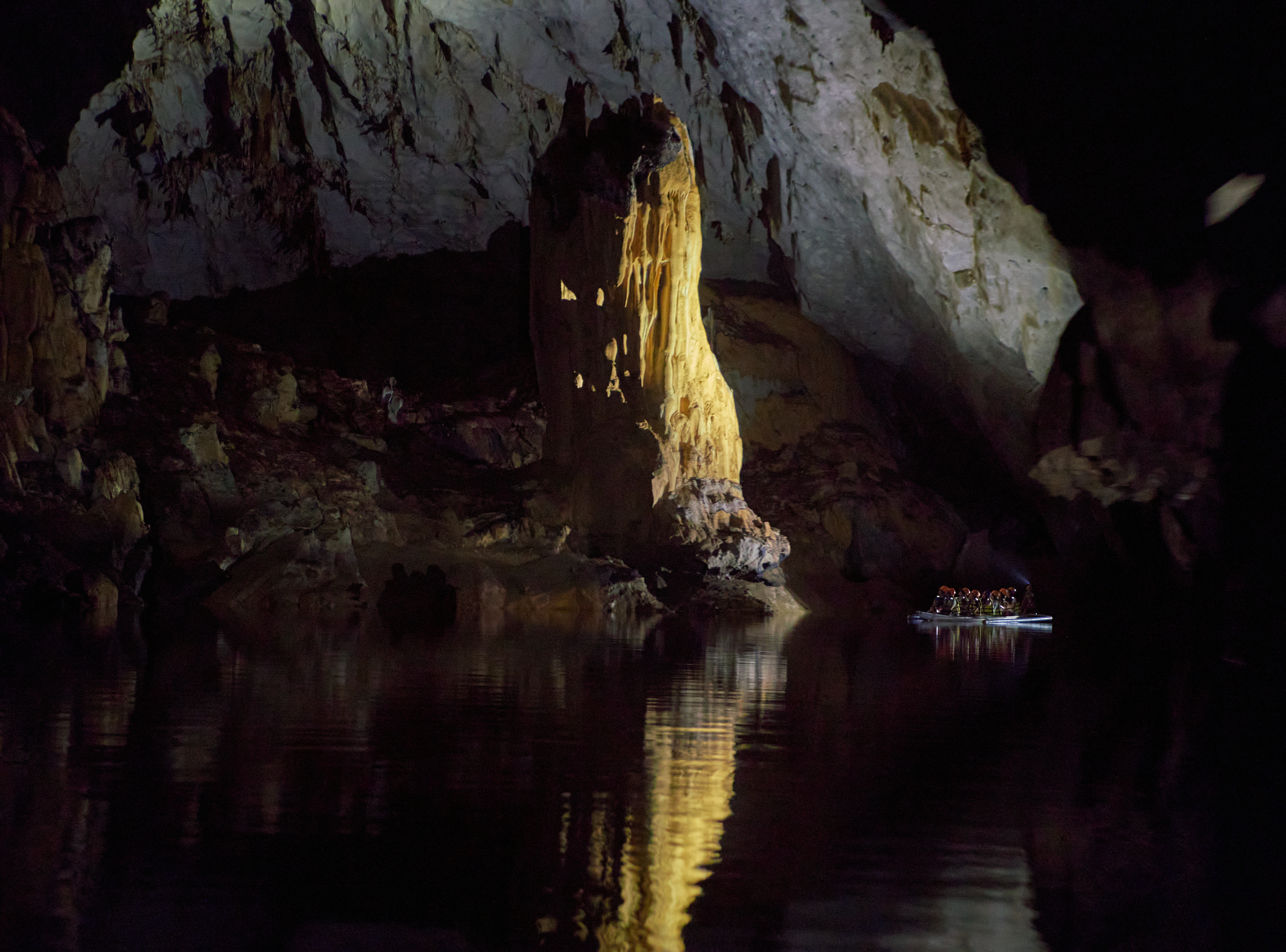
Cathedral Chamber

The park has a limestone karst mountain landscape. Its caves include major formations of stalactites and stalagmites, and several large chambers, including the 360-metre-long (1,180 ft) Italian's Chamber with approximate 2.5 million square meters volume. It is one of the largest cave rooms in the world. Until the 2007 discovery of an underground river in Mexico's Yucatán Peninsula, the Puerto Princesa Subterranean River was reputed to be the world's longest underground river.

The area also represents a habitat for biodiversity conservation. The site contains a full mountain-to-the-sea ecosystem and has some of the most important forests in Asia. It was inscribed by UNESCO as a World Heritage Site on December 4, 1999.

== Flora ==
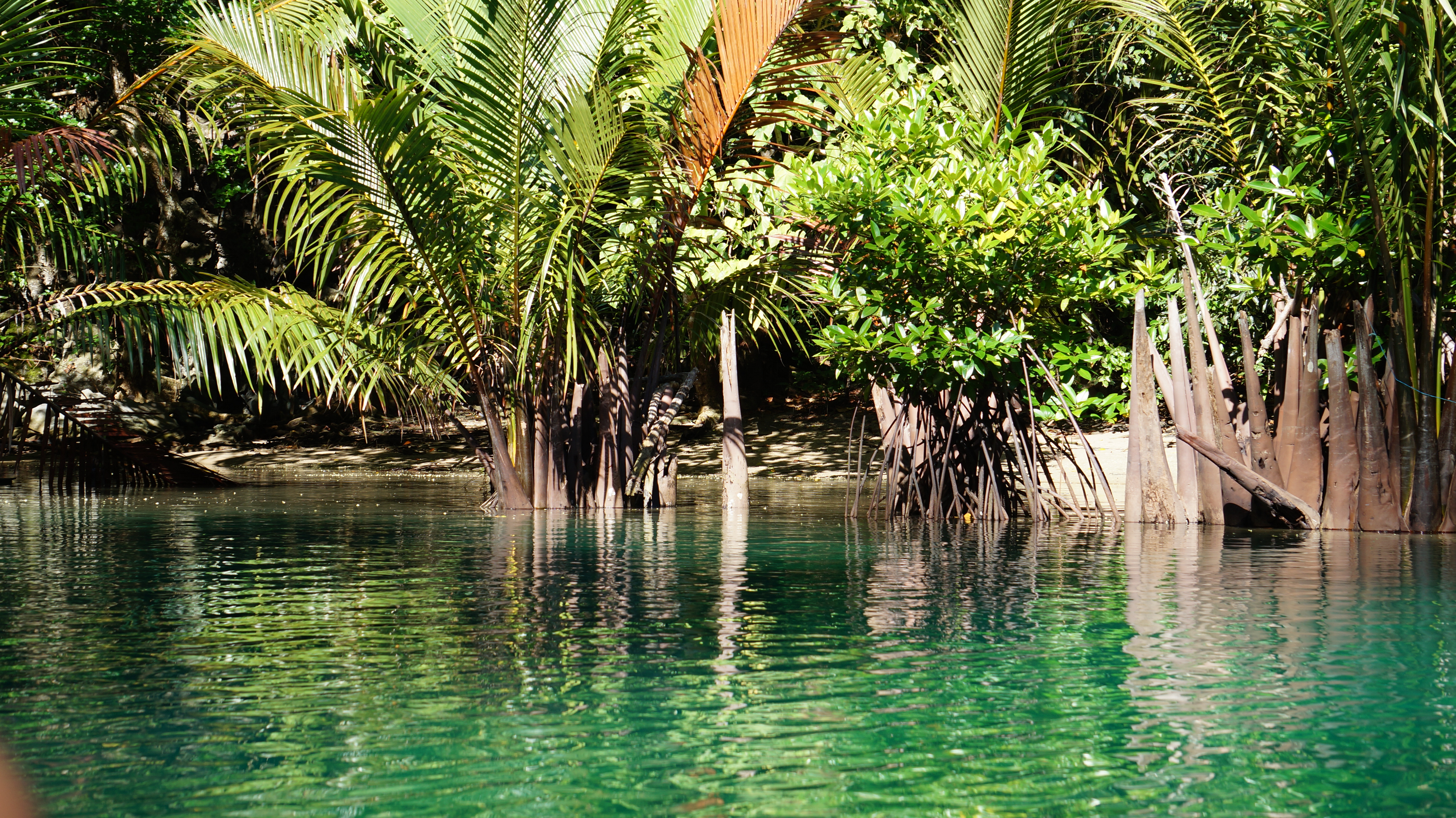
Flora at the national park

The park has a range of forest formations, the thirteen forest types found in tropical Asia, namely forest over ultramafic soils, forest over limestone soils, montane forest, freshwater swamp forest, lowland evergreen tropical rainforest, riverine forest, beach forest, and mangrove forest. Researchers have identified more than 800 plant species from 300 genera and 100 families. These include at least 295 trees dominated by the dipterocarp species. In the lowland forest, large trees including the dao (Dracontomelon dao), ipil (Intsia bijuga), dita (Alstonia scholaris), amugis (Koordersiodendron pinnatum), and apitong (Dipterocarpus gracilis) are common. Beach forest species include bitaog (Calophyllum inophyllum), Pongamia pinnata, and Erynthia orientalis. Other plant species include almaciga (Agathis philippinensis), kamagong (Diospyros pulganensis) pandan (Pandanus sp.) anibong, and rattan (Calamus sp.).

== Fauna ==
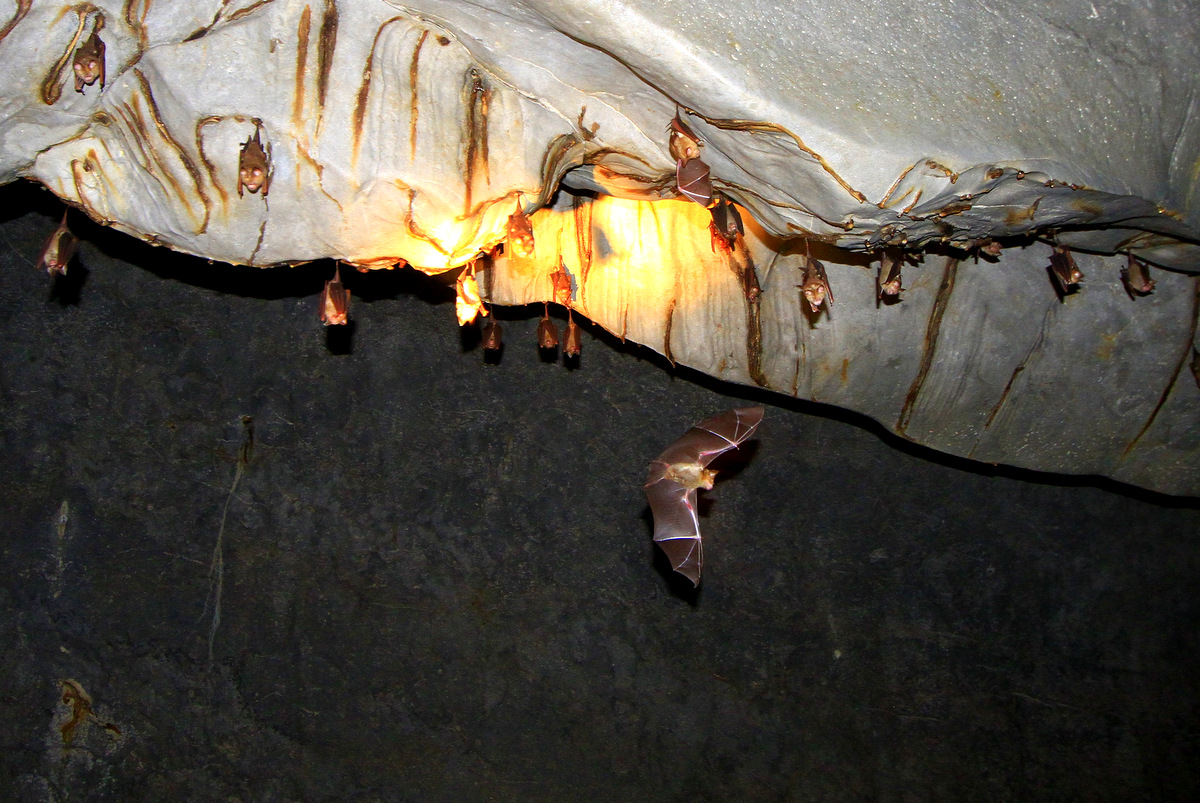
Bats hanging on the cave

Birds comprise the largest group of vertebrates found in the park. Of the 252 bird species known to occur in Palawan, a total of 165 species of birds were recorded in the park. This represents 67% of the total birds and all of the 15 endemic bird species of Palawan. Notable species seen in the park are the blue-naped parrot (Tanygnathus lucionensis), Tabon scrub fowl (Megapodius cumunigii), hill myna (Gracula religiosa), Palawan hornbill (Anthracoceros marchei), white breasted sea eagle (Haliaeetus leucogaster).

There are also some 30 mammal species that have been recorded. Most often observed in the forest canopy and along the shoreline feeding during low tide is the long-tailed macaque (Macaca fascicularis), the only primate found in the area. Other mammal species in the park are the Palawan bearded pig (Sus ahoenobarbus), bearcat (Arctictis binturong), Palawan stink badger (Mydaus marchei) and the Palawan porcupine (Hystrix pumila).

19 species of reptiles have been identified, eight of which are endemic. Common species in the area include large predators like the common reticulated python (Python reticulates), the monitor lizard (Varanus palawanensis) and the green crested lizard (Bronchocoela cristatella). Amphibian fauna include ten species. The Philippine woodland frog (Rana acanthi) is the most dominant and frequently encountered. One species, Barbourula busuangensis, endemic to Palawan was also observed in the area.

Nine species of bat, two species of swiftlet and whip spider (Stygophrynus sp.) are found in the cave, and the sea cow (Dugong dugon) and the hawksbill sea turtle (Chelonia mydas) feed in the coastal area of the park.

== International reception ==
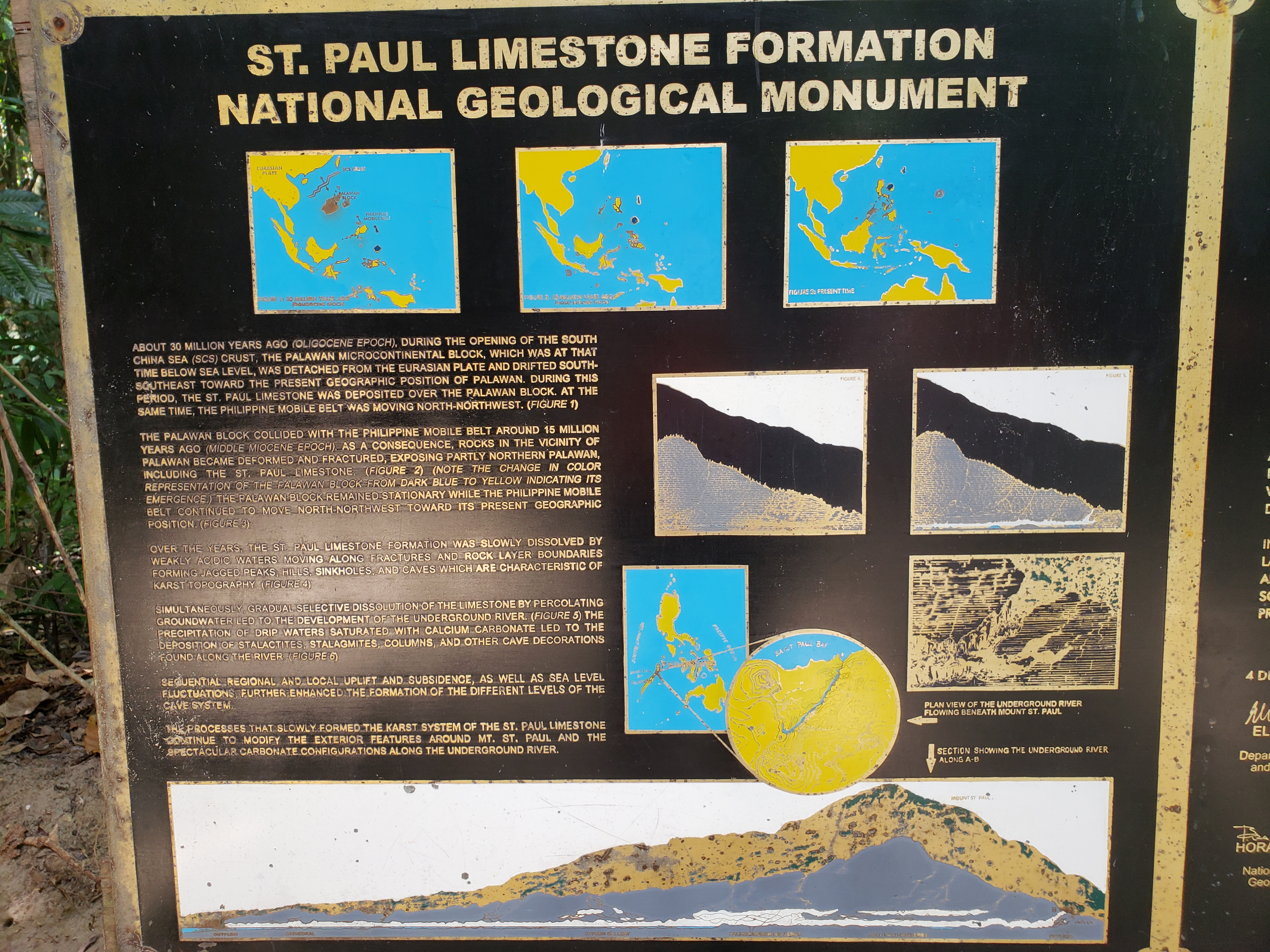
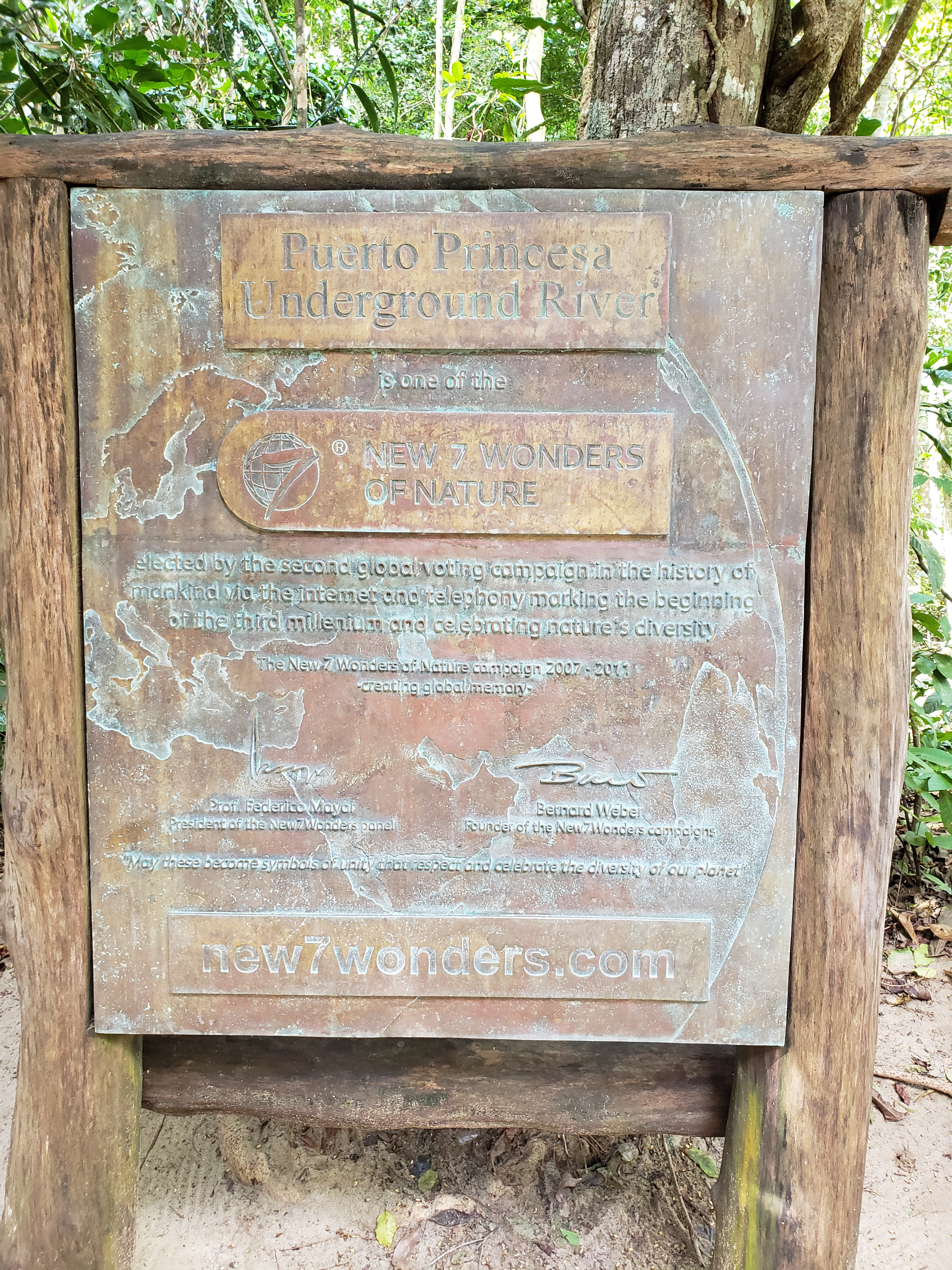
Park markers for the geologic history (left) and 7 new wonders designation (right)

Puerto Princesa Underground River was entered as the Philippine entry – and topped the first round of voting – in the New 7 Wonders of Nature competition. On July 29, 2011, after the second round of voting, it was declared 1 of 28 finalists. Mayor Edward S. Hagedorn extended his gratitude to all those who supported and voted for the PPUR. On November 11, 2011, it was provisionally chosen as one of the New7Wonders, together with the Amazon rainforest, Halong Bay, Iguazu Falls, Jeju Island, Komodo Island, and Table Mountain.

On January 28, 2012, Malacañang expressed elation over the official inclusion of the Puerto Princesa Underground River (PPUR) in the world's New Seven Wonders of Nature. "Confirmation that the Puerto Princesa Underground River is one of the New Seven Wonders of Nature is welcome news indeed. Throughout the competition, Filipinos from all walks of life have given time, energy, and resources to this campaign", Presidential Spokesperson Edwin Lacierda said.

Department of Tourism spokesman and Assistant Secretary Benito Bengzon Jr. said the underground estuary made it into the world's New Seven Wonders of Nature after the validation process conducted by the New7Wonders Foundation last year. The voting was criticized, especially the Philippine voting. Nothing in the New7Wonders voting procedure prohibited repetitive voting, making the results subject to government and tourism industry campaigns to vote often for local sites with the financial incentive of increased tourism. Philippine President Benigno Simeon Aquino III, in his speech during the official proclamation launch of the Puerto Princesa Underground River as one of the 28 finalists, urged the country's 80 million cellphone subscribers to vote PPUR via text.

On June 30, 2019, Puerto Princesa underground river was celebrated with a Google Doodle.

== See also ==
- List of World Heritage Sites in the Philippines
- List of national parks of the Philippines
- ASEAN Heritage Parks
