= Registry of Cultural Property =

Registry of Cultural Property may refer to:

- Registry of Cultural Property (Lithuania)
- Registry of Cultural Property (Poland)
- Philippine Registry of Cultural Property
