= Philippine Registry of Cultural Property =

National registry of cultural heritage

Philippine Registry of Heritage (formerly known as Philippine Registry of Cultural Property)
- Talapamana ng Pilipinas (Filipino)

Designation details
- Authority: National Commission for Culture and the Arts
- Type: National registry
- Country: Philippines
- Year introduced: 2009; 16 years ago
- Website: ncca.gov.ph/philippine-registry-cultural-property-precup/

The Philippine Registry of Heritage or TALAPAMANA ng Pilipinas (formerly Philippine Registry of Cultural Property, abbreviated as PRECUP) (Filipino: Patalaan ng mga Ari-ariang Kultural ng Pilipinas), is a national registry of the Philippine Government used to consolidate in one record all cultural property that are deemed important to the cultural heritage, tangible and intangible, of the Philippines. On June 11, 2018, the entries in the newly updated PRECUP was at 3,921. Additionally, 1,259 out of 1,715 LGUs (provincial, municipal/city-levels), or 73 percent of LGUs have established local cultural inventories (LCI).

== Establishment ==
This registry was established by the National Cultural Heritage Act of 2009 (Republic Act No. 10066) Section 14 which says "All cultural properties of the country deemed important to cultural heritage shall be registered in the Philippine Registry of Cultural Property."

== Implementation ==
The National Commission for Culture and the Arts is mandated to establish and maintain the registry, through the appropriate cultural agencies and local government units, within three years from the effectivity of the act. As stated in Section 14 of said legislation, the guidelines in the registration of cultural property are as follows:

(a) All cultural agencies concerned shall individually maintain an inventory, evaluation and documentation of all cultural properties it has declared according to their category and shall submit the same to the Commission. For cultural property declared as Immovable Cultural Property, the appropriate cultural agency shall, after registration, give due notice to the Registry of Deeds having jurisdiction for annotation on the land titles pertaining to the same;

(b) Local government units, through their cultural offices, shall likewise maintain an inventory of cultural property under its jurisdiction and shall furnish the Commission a copy of the same;

(c) Both cultural agencies concerned and local government units shall continuously coordinate in making entries and in monitoring the various cultural properties in their respective inventory;

(d) All government agencies and instrumentalities, government-owned and/or controlled corporations and their subsidiaries, including public and private educational institutions, shall report their ownership and/or possession of such items to the pertinent cultural agency and shall register such properties within three years from the effectivity of this Act;

(e) Private collectors and owners of cultural property shall register such properties, within three years from the effectivity of this Act. The private collectors and owners of cultural property shall not be divested of their possession and ownership thereof even after registration of said property as herein required.

Information on registered cultural properties owned by private individuals shall remain confidential and may be given only upon prior consent of the private owner. The Commission shall operate the Registry in the NCCA portal cultural databank.

=== Issue on ownership ===
It was clarified that by its enactment, Republic Act No. 10066 does not transfer ownership of the properties, identified as part of the Philippines' cultural heritage, to the state.

== Contents ==
The highest cultural properties under the PRECUP are UNESCO inscriptions, followed by National Cultural Treasures and Important Cultural Properties. In resolution 2017-330 released on December 19, 2017, entitled "Guidelines governing PRECUP", the properties that can be included in the PRECUP are as follow:

- Grade I level properties including:
  - World Heritage Sites as inscribed by the United Nations Educational, Scientific, and Cultural Organization (UNESCO)
  - National Cultural Treasures or unique cultural property found locally which has outstanding historical, cultural, artistic, and/or scientific value. It is highly significant and important to the country and is officially declared by the National Museum, the National Library, and the National Archive
    - Archaeological and traditional ethnographic materials with outstanding historical, cultural, artistic, and/or scientific value which is nationally significant and important to the nation, and officially declared as such by the National Museum
    - Filipiniana materials (or the basis for such) as officially declared by the National Library, that satisfy all of the following criteria:
      - Unique and outstanding representation of Philippine history, culture, and/or literature
      - First of its kind in the Philippines
      - One of ten (or fewer) known copies around the world
      - Possessed demonstrable evidence of historical, literary, and/or cultural significance, as seen in multiple printings, editions, translations, and/or adaptations in various formats over a period of at least four decades
  - National Historical Landmarks or sites or structures that are associated with events or achievements significant to Philippine history as declared by the National Historical Commission of the Philippines (NHCP)
  - National Historical Shrines or cultural property which are hallowed and revered for their history or association as declared by the NHCP
  - National Historical Monuments or structures that honor illustrious persons or commemorate events of historical value as declared by the NHCP
  - Heritage Houses as declared by the NHCP
  - Heritage Zones as declared by the National Museum and/or the NHCP in consultation with the National Commission for Culture and the Arts (NCCA) and the Housing and Land Use Regulatory Board or other concerned agencies
- Grade II level or Important Cultural Properties (ICPs) including:
  - Important Cultural Properties or cultural properties having exceptional cultural, artistic, and historical significance to the Philippines as declared by the National Museum, the National Library, and the National Archives
    - Filipiniana materials (or the basis for such) as officially declared by the National Library
      - Created by a National Artist or a national hero
      - Such that satisfy all the following criteria:
        - Unique or outstanding representation of Philippine history, culture, and/or literature
        - One of one hundred (or fewer) known copies around the world (may include first editions)
        - Possesses demonstrable evidence of historical, literary, and/or cultural significance, as seen in multiple printings, editions, translations, and/or adaptations in various formats over a period of at least two decades
  - Works by Manlilika ng Bayan awardees unless declared by the appropriate cultural agencies, or its presumption removed by the NCCA
  - Works by National Artists unless declared by the appropriate cultural agencies, or its presumption removed by the NCCA
  - All archaeological, traditional, ethnographic materials, unless declared or its presumption removed by the NCCA
    - Archaeological materials dated back to Paleolithic, Neolithic, and Metal periods
    - Archaeological materials attributed to the Tang, Five, and Yuan Dynasties
    - Archaeological materials attributed to the Song, Ming, and Ching Dynasties; and other archaeological materials from other countries with exceptional cultural, artistic, and historical significance to the Philippines, as determined by the National Museum
    - Ethnographic materials that are at least 100 years old from date of collection, with cultural significance and extensive documentation
  - All sites and structures bearing historical markers installed by the NHCP and its predecessors
  - Classified Historic Structures, covering all heritage churches and houses of worship before the year 1940, as declared by the NCHP
  - Archival materials or documents at least 50 years old unless declared or its presumption removed by the NCCA
  - Rare books, special collections, and incunabula unless declared of its presumption removed by the National Library
  - All holotypes of fossils, plants, and animals
  - Structures dating at least 50 years old
  - Archival material/document dating at least 50 years old
- Grade III level or Cultural Properties (CPs). These are all other cultural properties not declared as Grades I or II
  - Archaeological materials not classified as Grades I or II that have been listed by the National Museum
  - Ethnographic materials that are at least 50 years old from the date of collection, with cultural significance and proper documentation
  - All other Filipiniana materials not classified as Grades I or II as declared by the National Library
- Uncategorized Property not falling under the presumption of Important Cultural Property but contains characteristics that will qualify as such
- Local Cultural Properties or cultural properties which are significant to local culture and history as declared by the Sanggunian or Legislative Assembly
  - Regional Cultural Property as designated by an ordinance of the Regional Legislative Assembly
  - Provincial Cultural Property as designated by an ordinance of the Sangguniang Panlalawigan
  - City Cultural Property as designated by an ordinance of the Sangguniang Panlungsod
  - Municipal Cultural Property as designated by an ordinance of the Sangguniang Bayan
  - Barangay Cultural Property as designated by an ordinance of the Sangguniang Banrangay
- Lists of Intangible Cultural Heritage as inscribed by the UNESCO
- Intangible cultural heritage elements, under the Philippine Inventory of Intangible Cultural Heritage (PIICH), in one or more of the 5 domains provided by UNESCO:
  - (1) Oral traditions and expressions, including language as a vehicle of Intangible cultural heritage
  - (2) Performing arts
  - (3) Social practices, rituals, and festive events
  - (4) Knowledge and practices concerning nature and the universe
  - (5) Traditional craftsmanship

== Registration by LGU ==
Cultural properties are registered through the combined effort of Cultural Agencies including the National Museum, the National Historical Commission of the Philippines, the National Archives, and the National Library of the Philippines as well as of Local Government Units (LGUs). They shall work together in updating the PRECUP.

- All cultural agencies shall individually maintain an inventory, evaluation and documentation of all cultural properties declared according to their category and shall submit the same to the commission.
- Local government units, through their cultural offices, shall likewise maintain an inventory of cultural property under its jurisdiction and shall furnish the commission a copy of the same;
- All government agencies and instrumentalities, government-owned and/or controlled corporations and their subsidiaries, including public and private educational institutions, report their ownership and/or possession of such items to the pertinent cultural agency.
- Private collectors and owners shall register their cultural property to the National Museum. Registered cultural properties shall remain in the possession of their private owners.

== Gallery ==
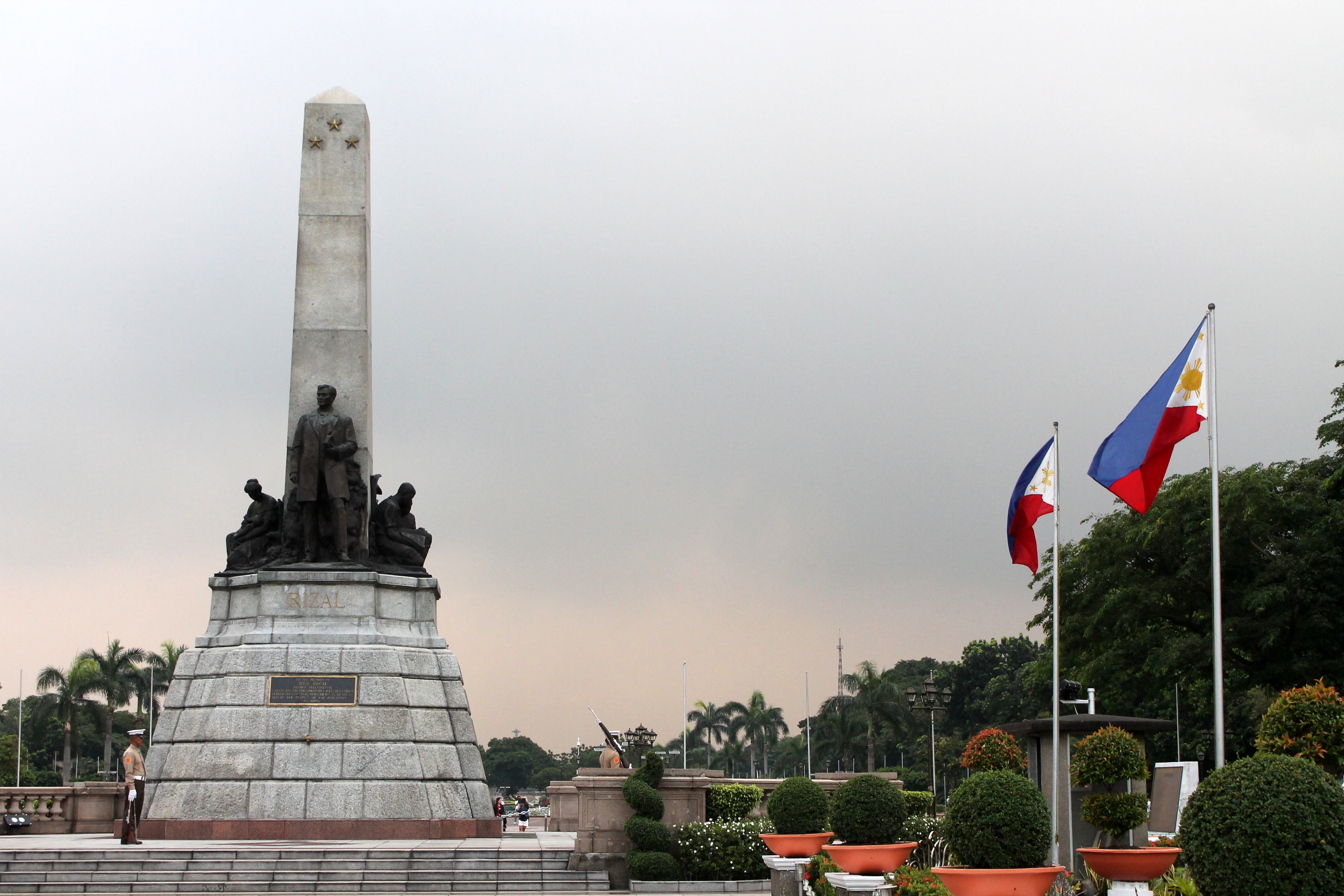
Rizal Monument, the most important monument in the country dedicated to national hero Jose Rizal

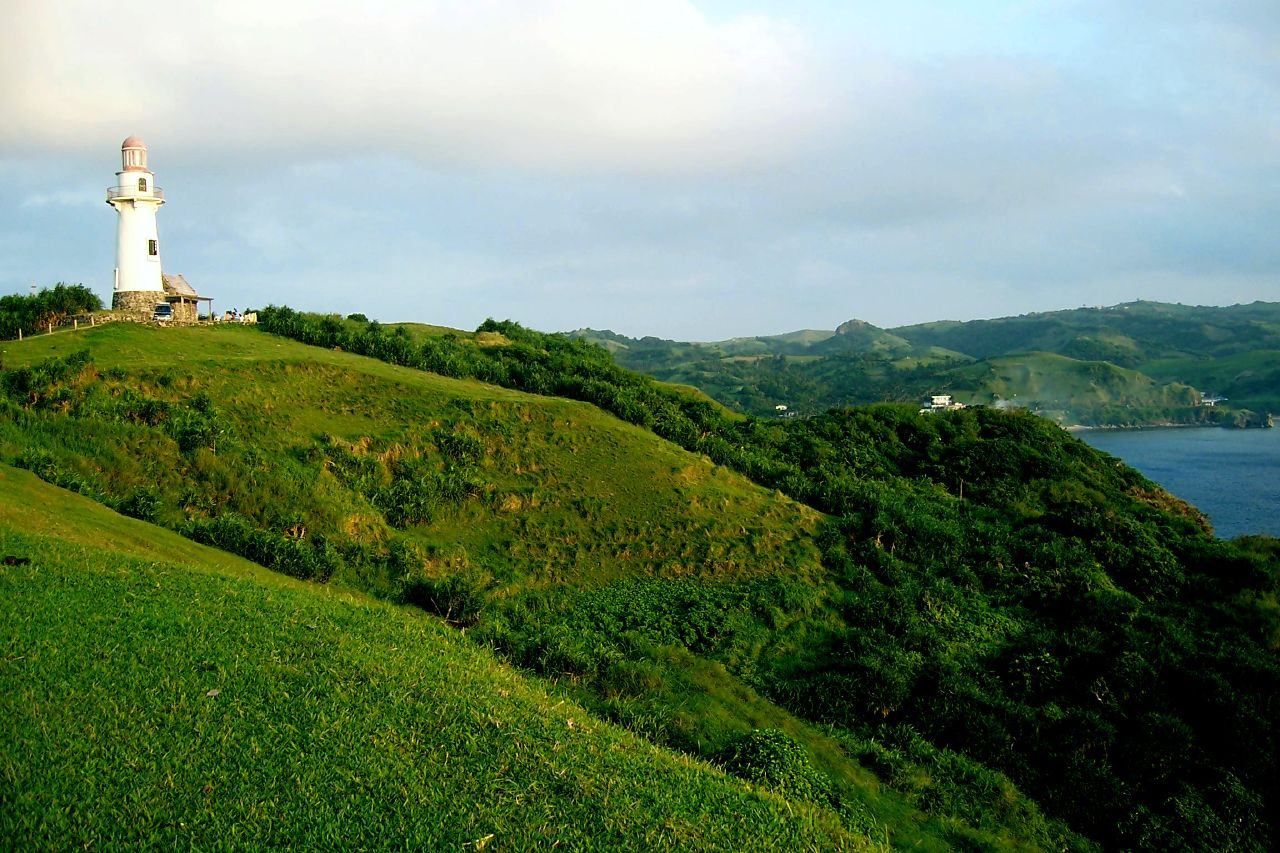
Basco Lighthouse in the Batanes Protected Landscape and Seascape

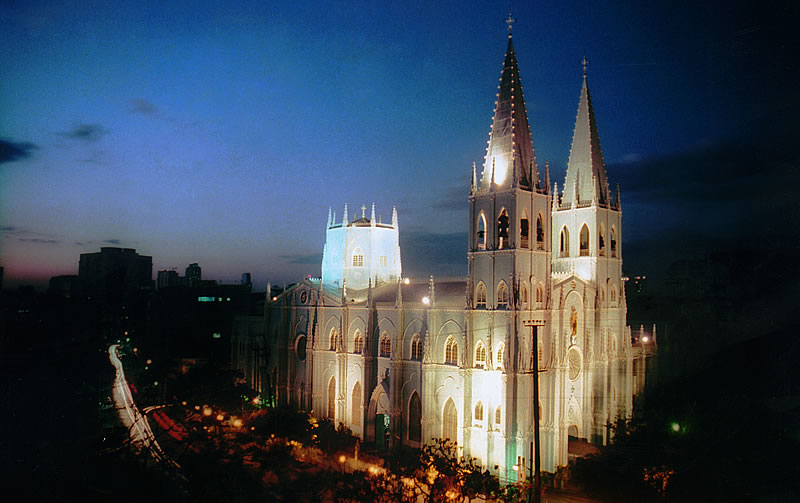
San Sebastian Church, the first and only all-steel church in Asia

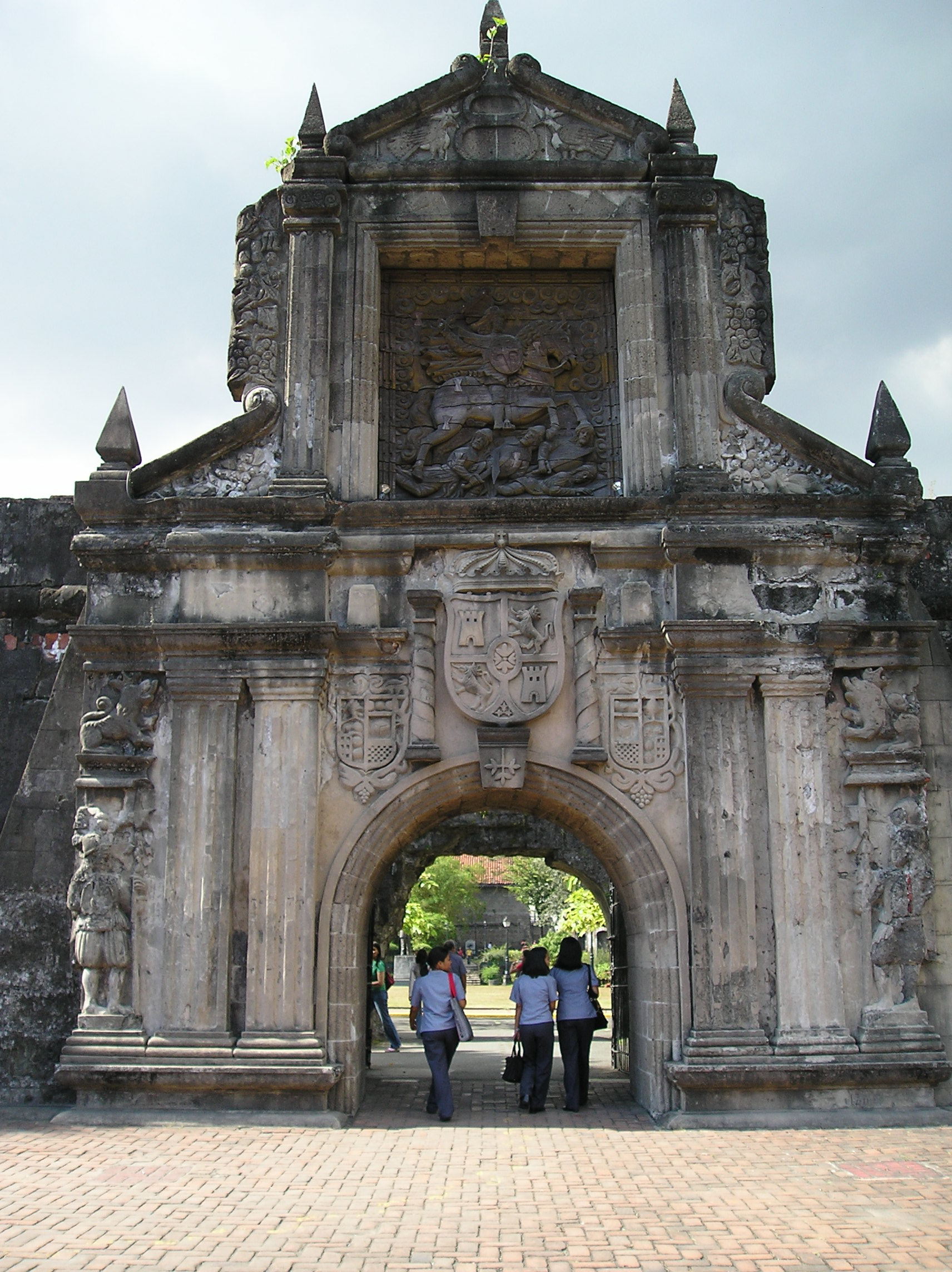
Fort Santiago gate, one of the entrances to Manila's Intramuros district

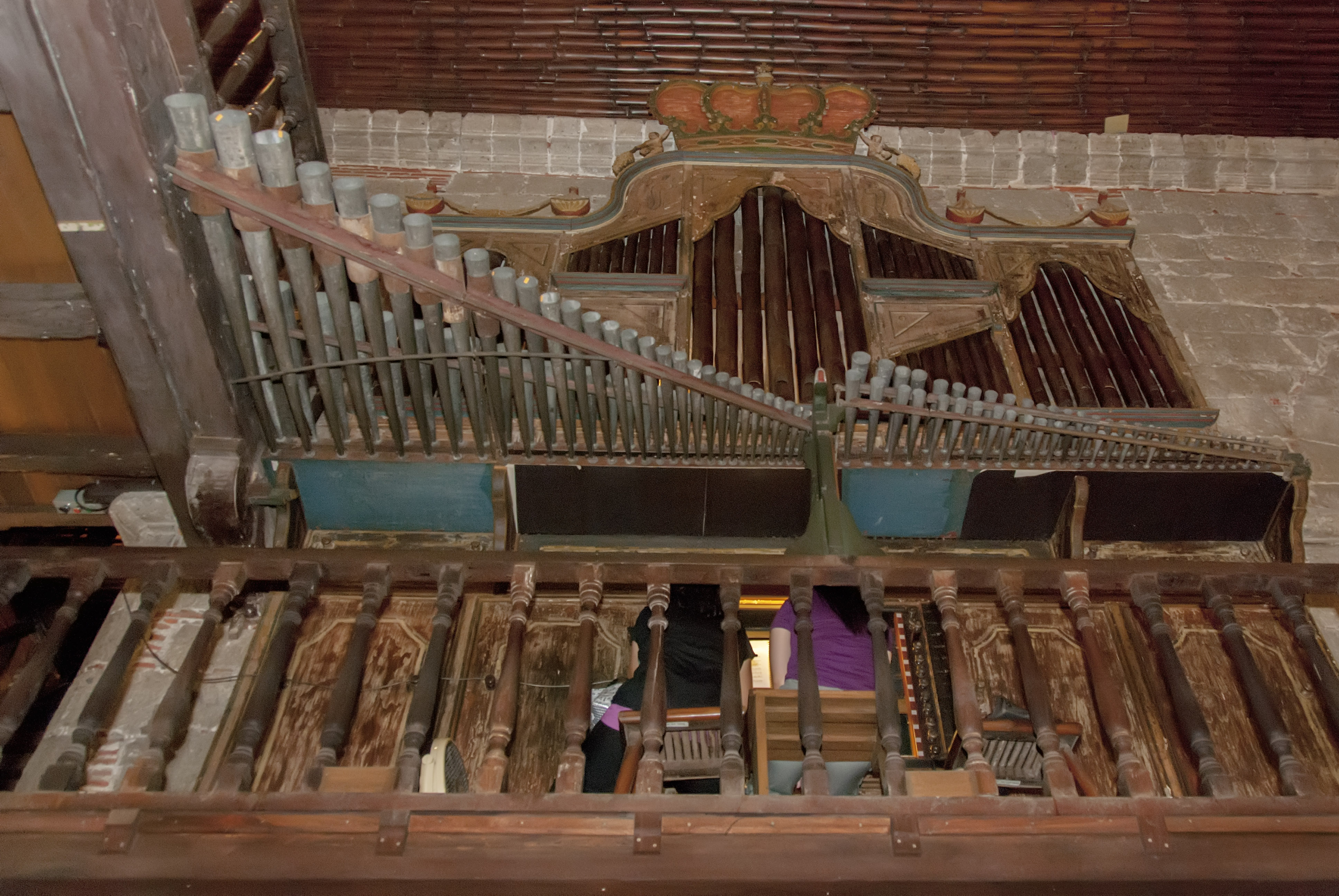
Las Piñas Bamboo Organ, the only bamboo organ in the world

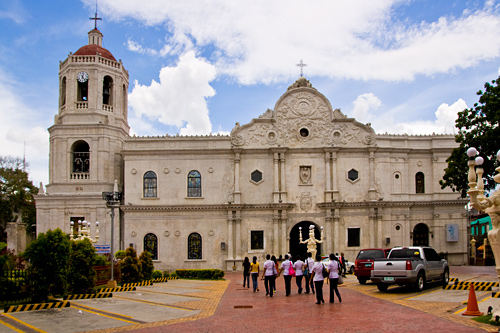
Cebu Metropolitan Cathedral, location of the first church in the Far East

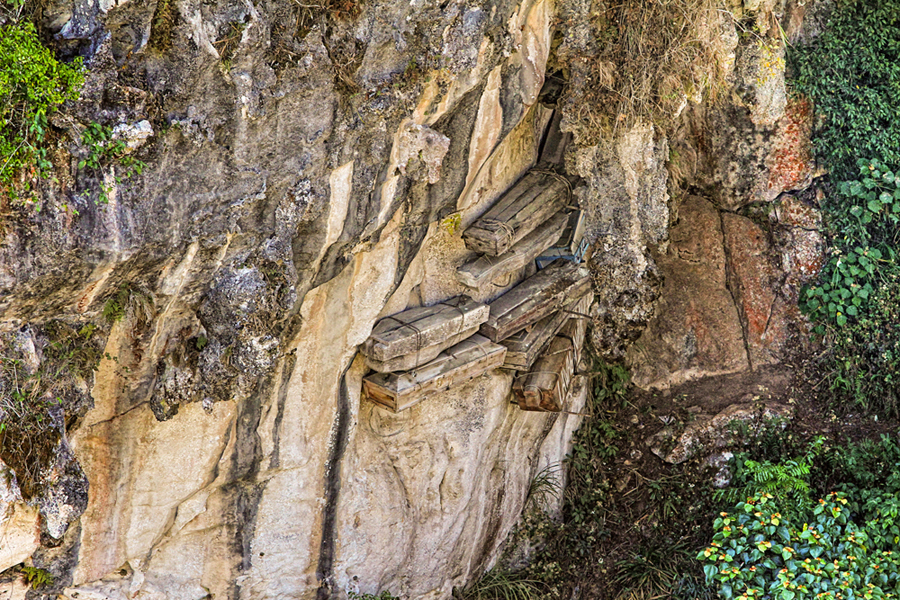
Hanging coffins in Sagada, Mountain Province

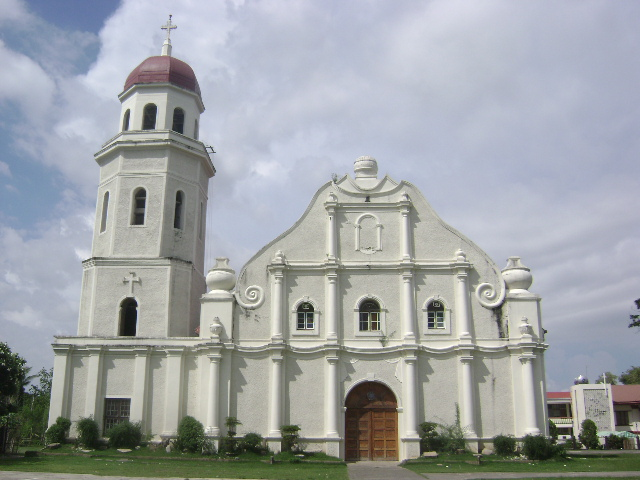
Santa Catalina de Alejandria Parish Church in Abra

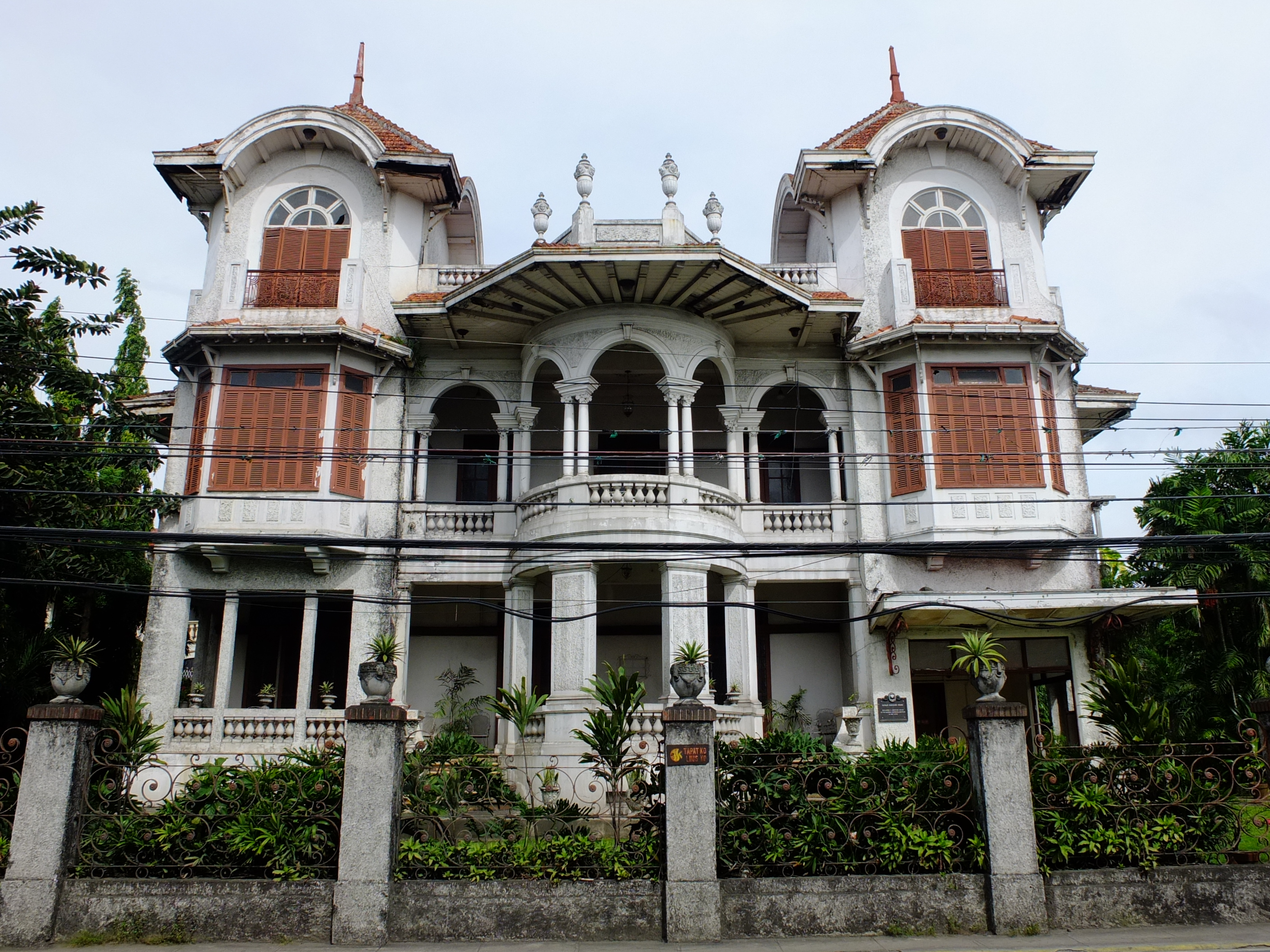
One of the many Art Deco structures in Sariaya, the Philippine Art Deco capital

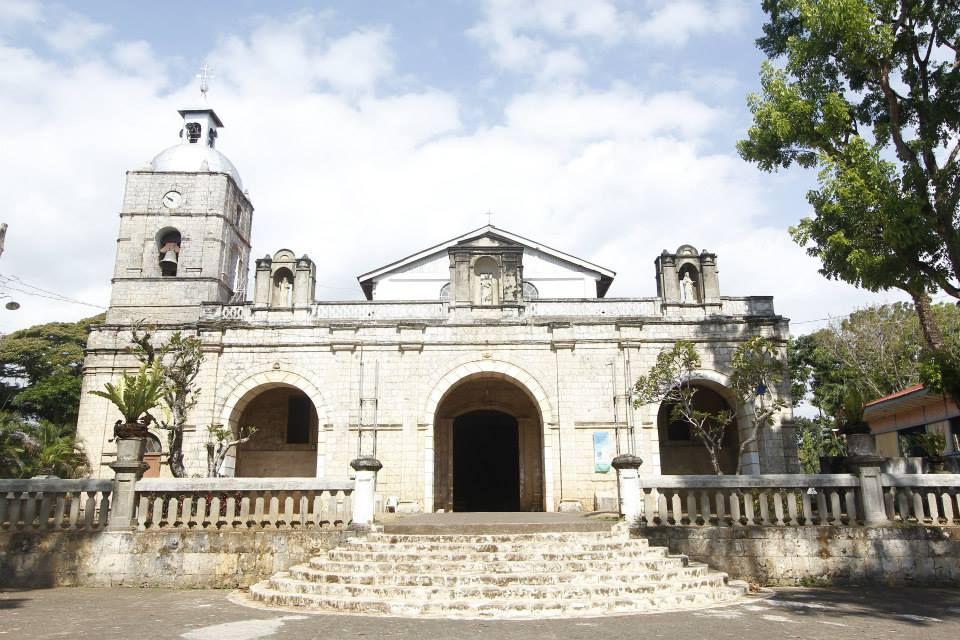
Parish Church of St. John the Baptist in Jimenez

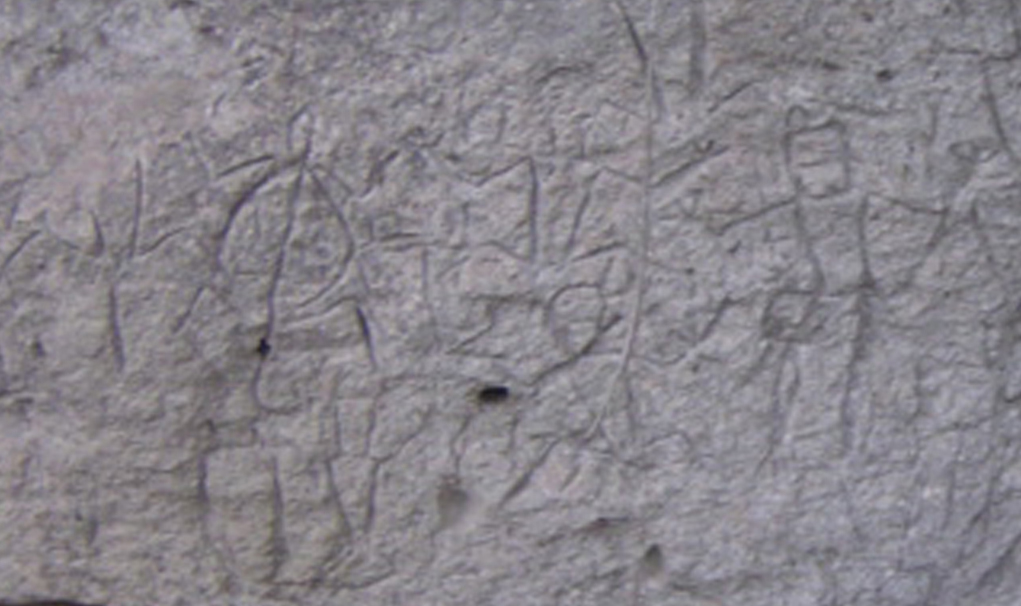
Some of the carvings in the Angono Petroglyphs, the oldest rock art in the Philippines

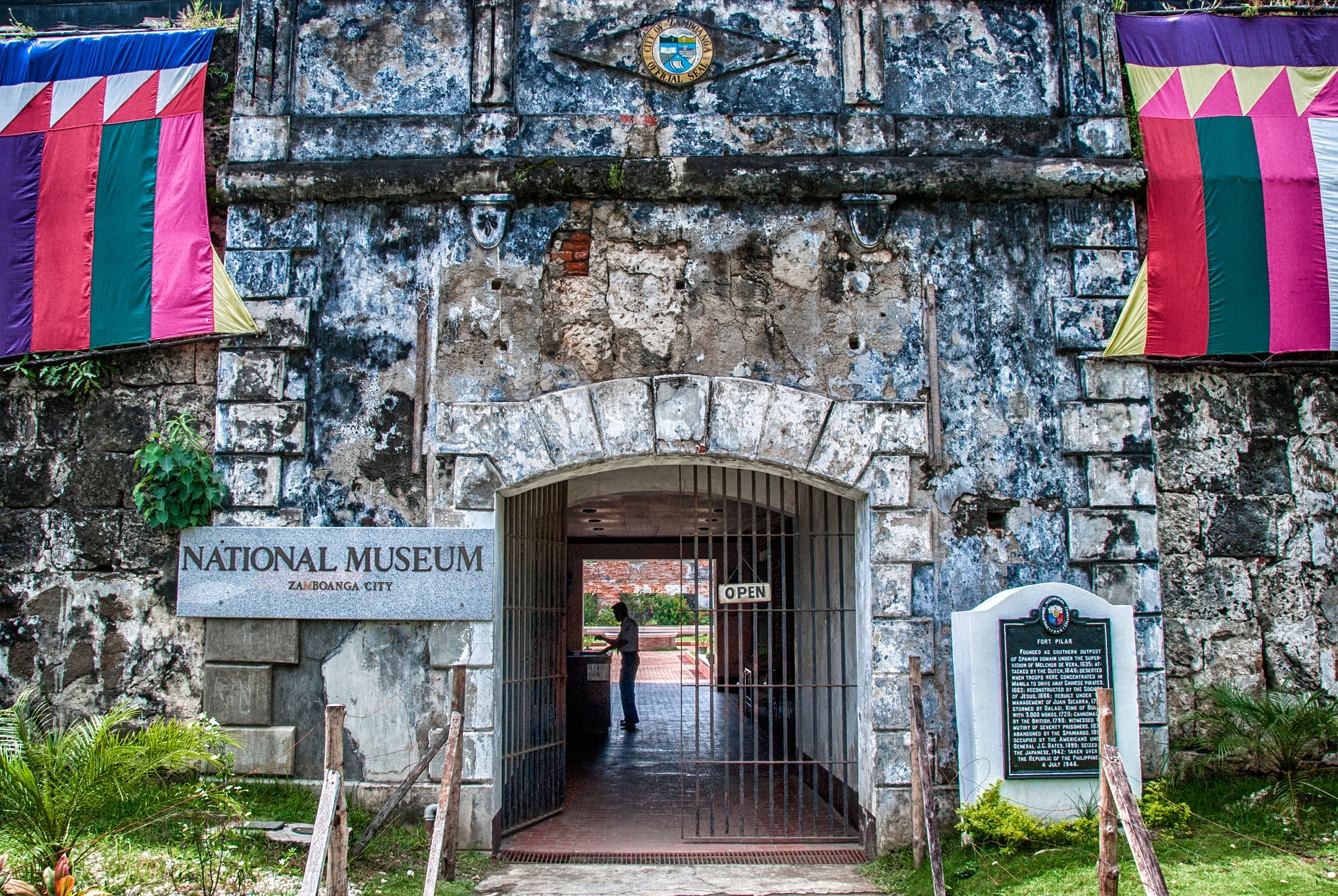
Fort Pilar in Zamboanga City

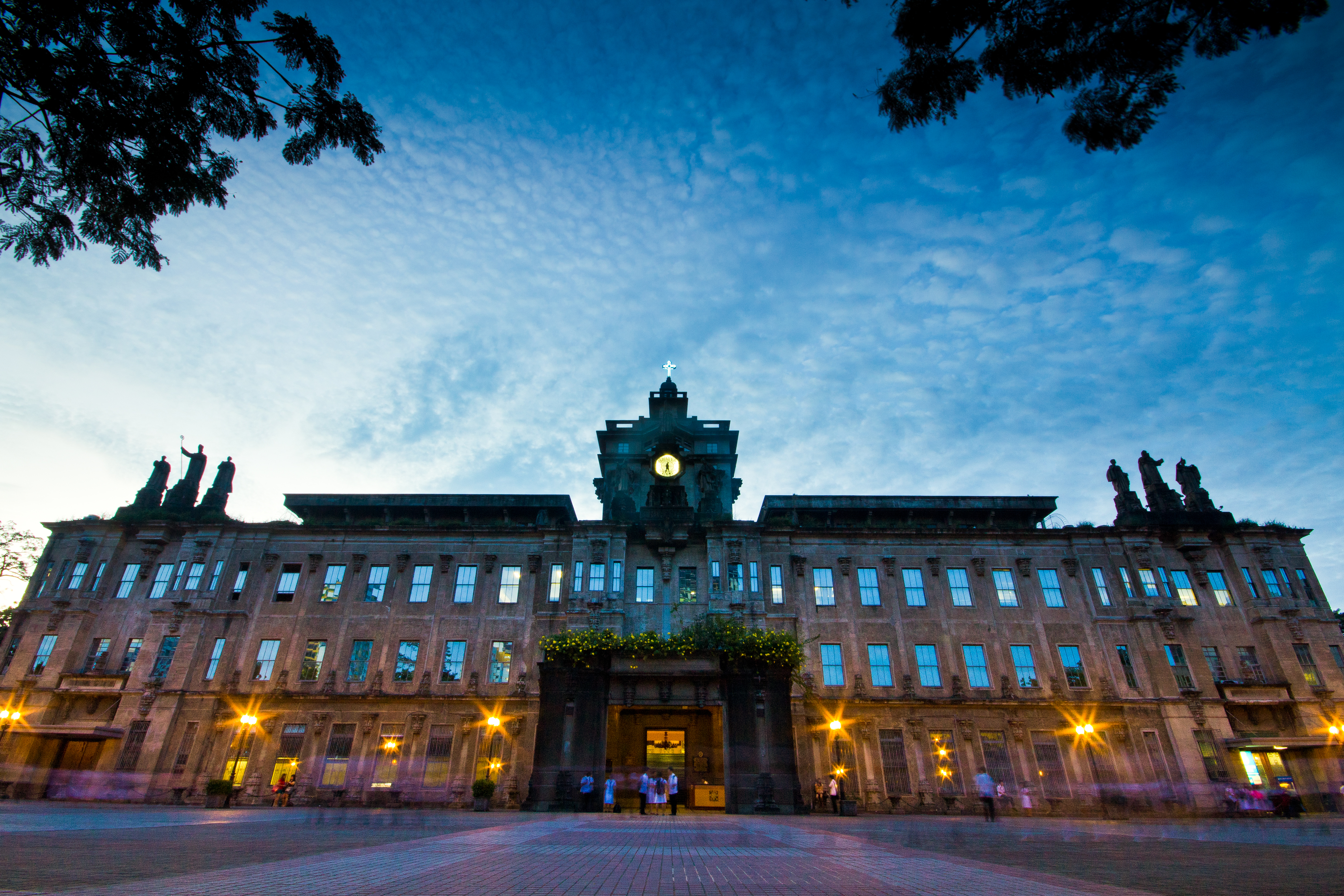
The University of Santo Tomas possesses the oldest extant university charter in Asia and houses the largest collection of baybayin artifacts

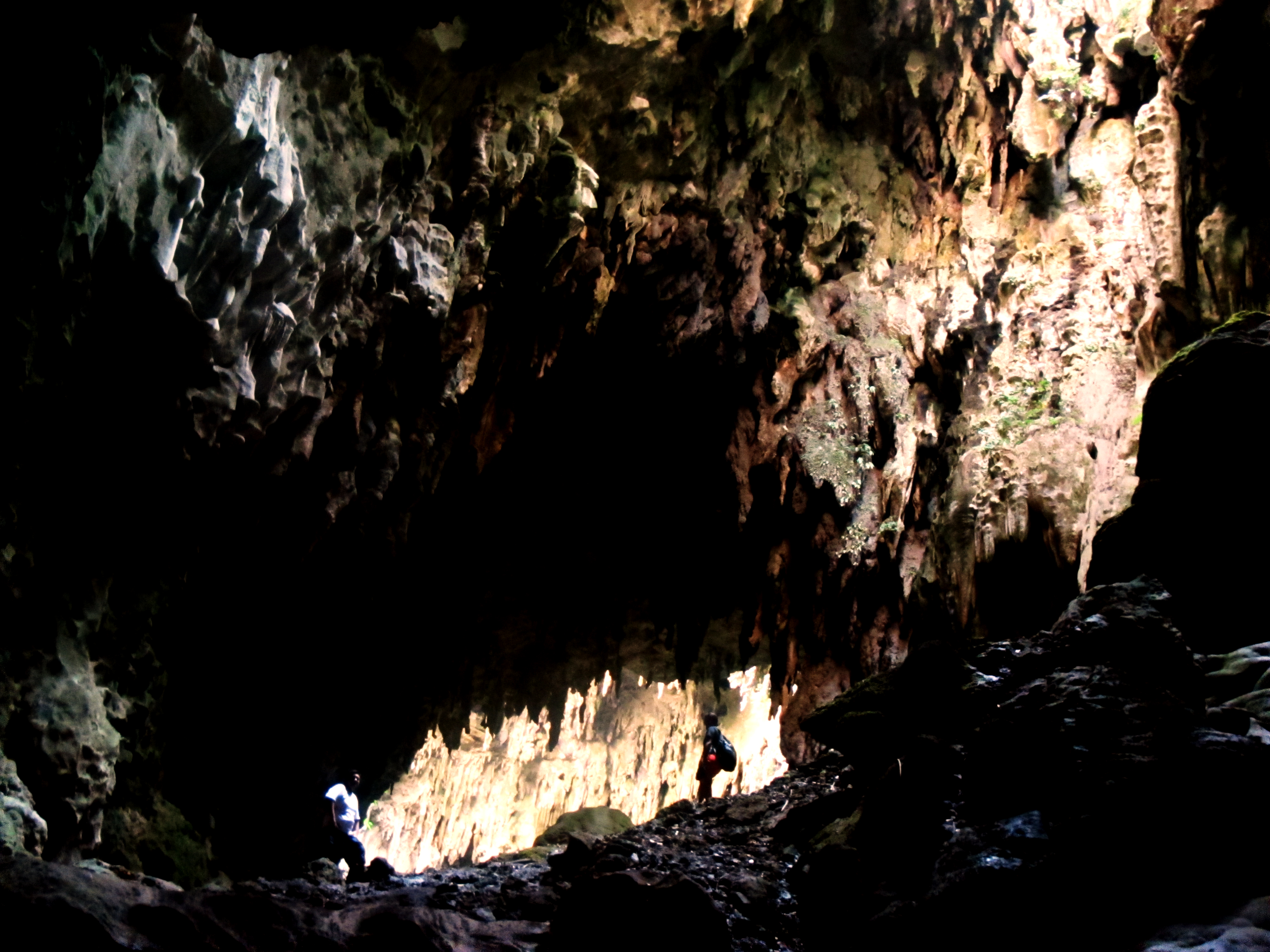
Callao Cave, a Paleolithic site in the Cagayan Valley where the 67,000-year old Callao Man was found

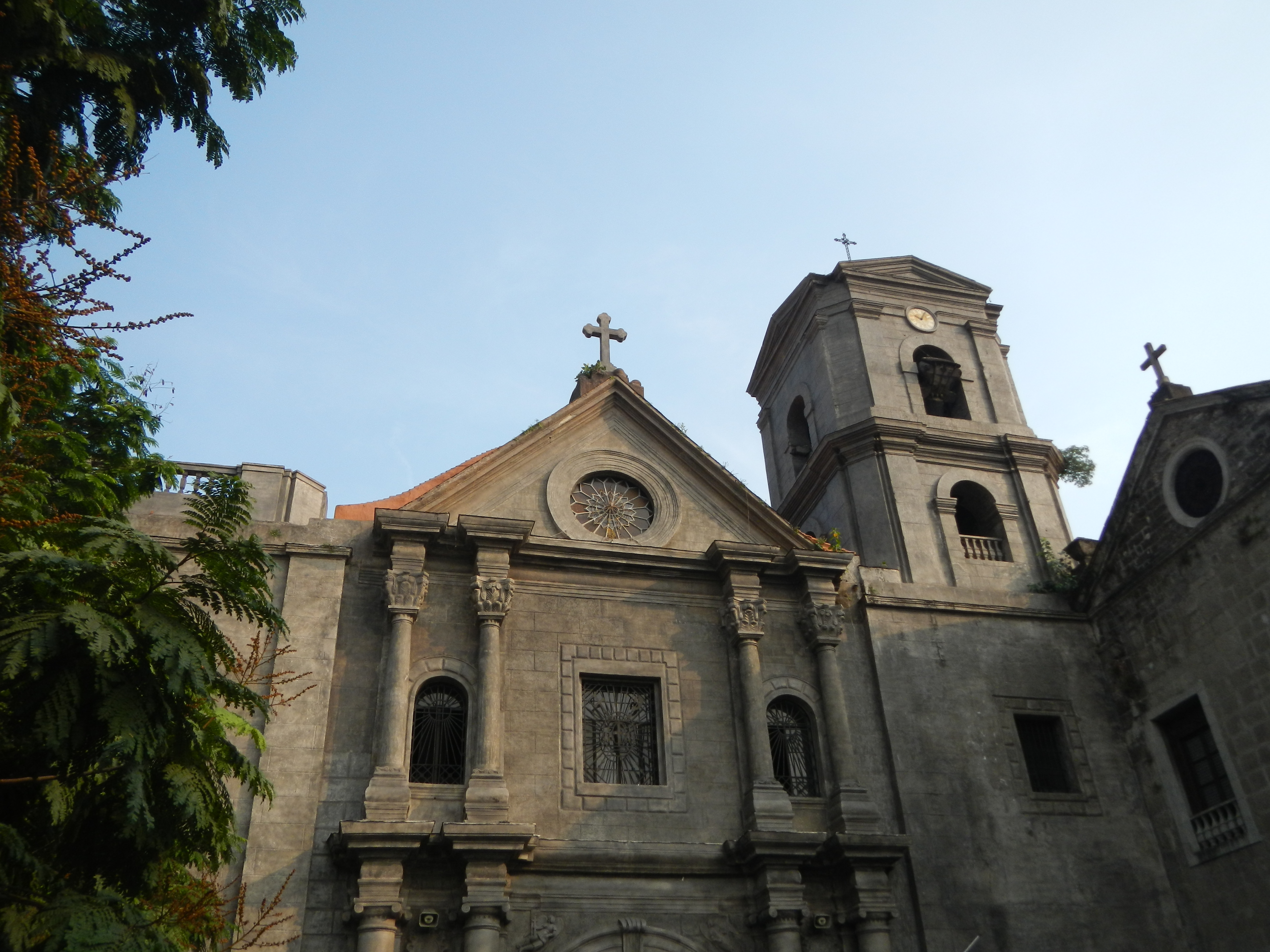
San Agustin Church of Manila, UNESCO World Heritage Site

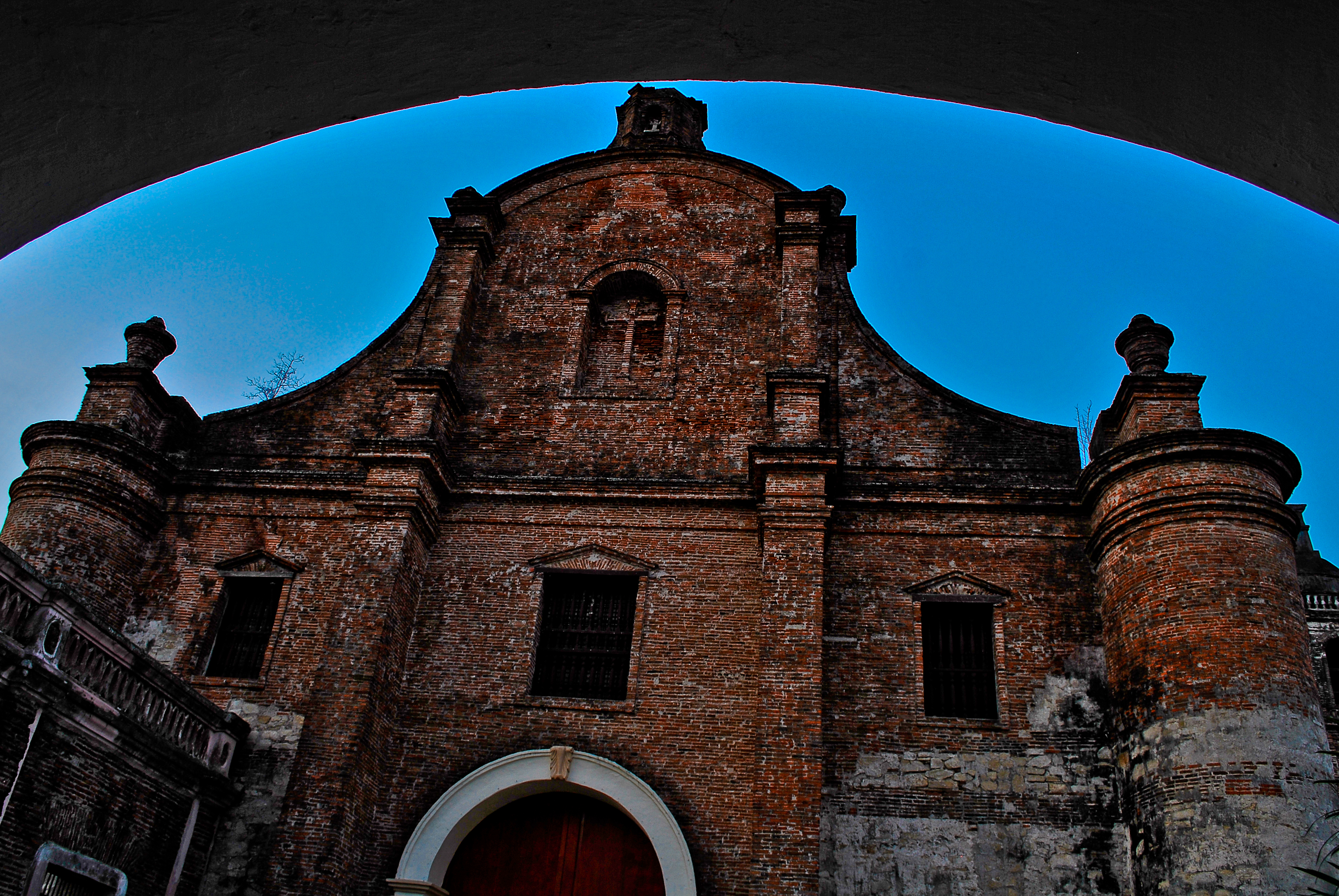
Santa Maria Church, UNESCO World Heritage Site

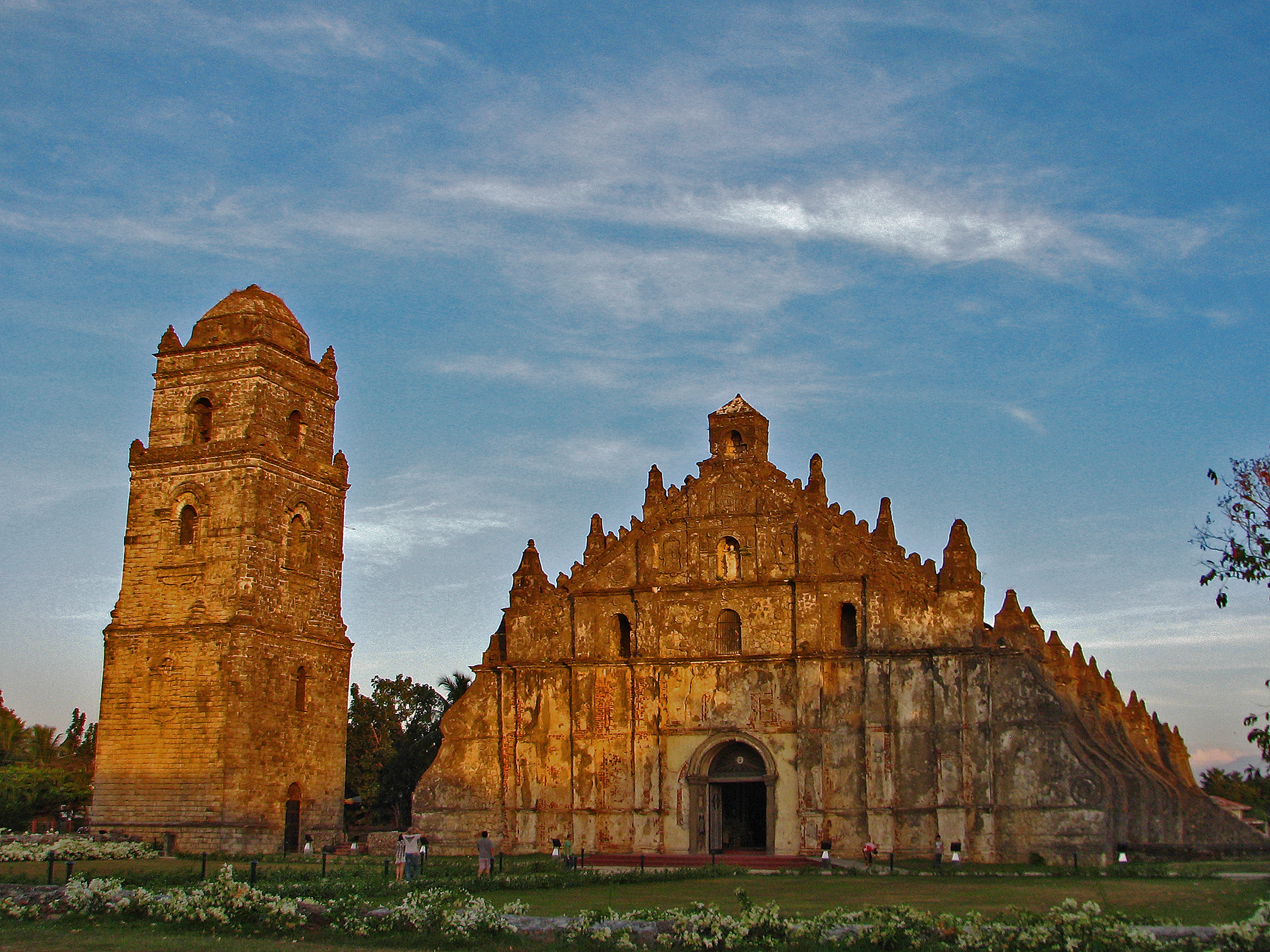
Paoay Church, UNESCO World Heritage Site

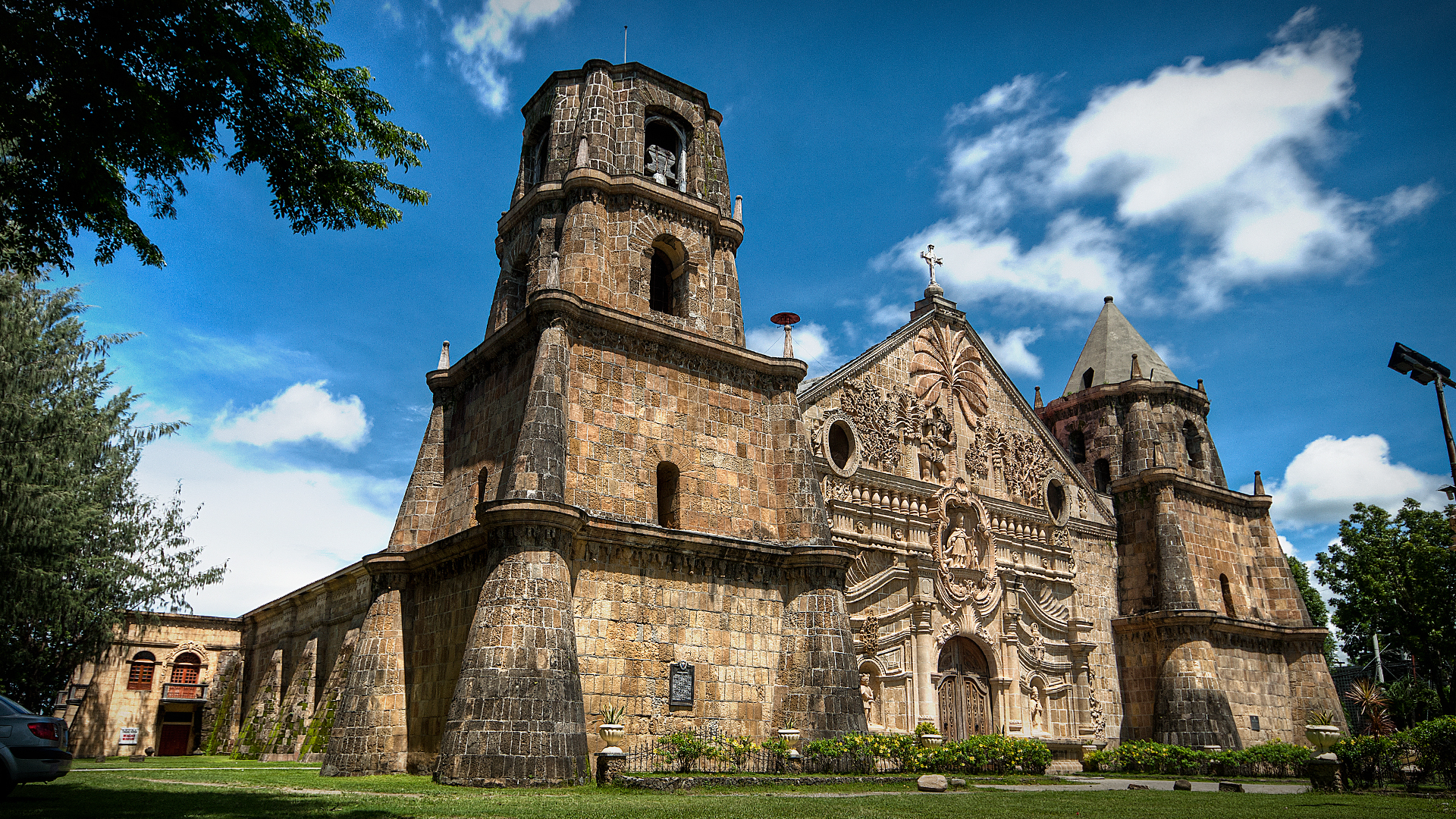
Miagao Church, UNESCO World Heritage Site

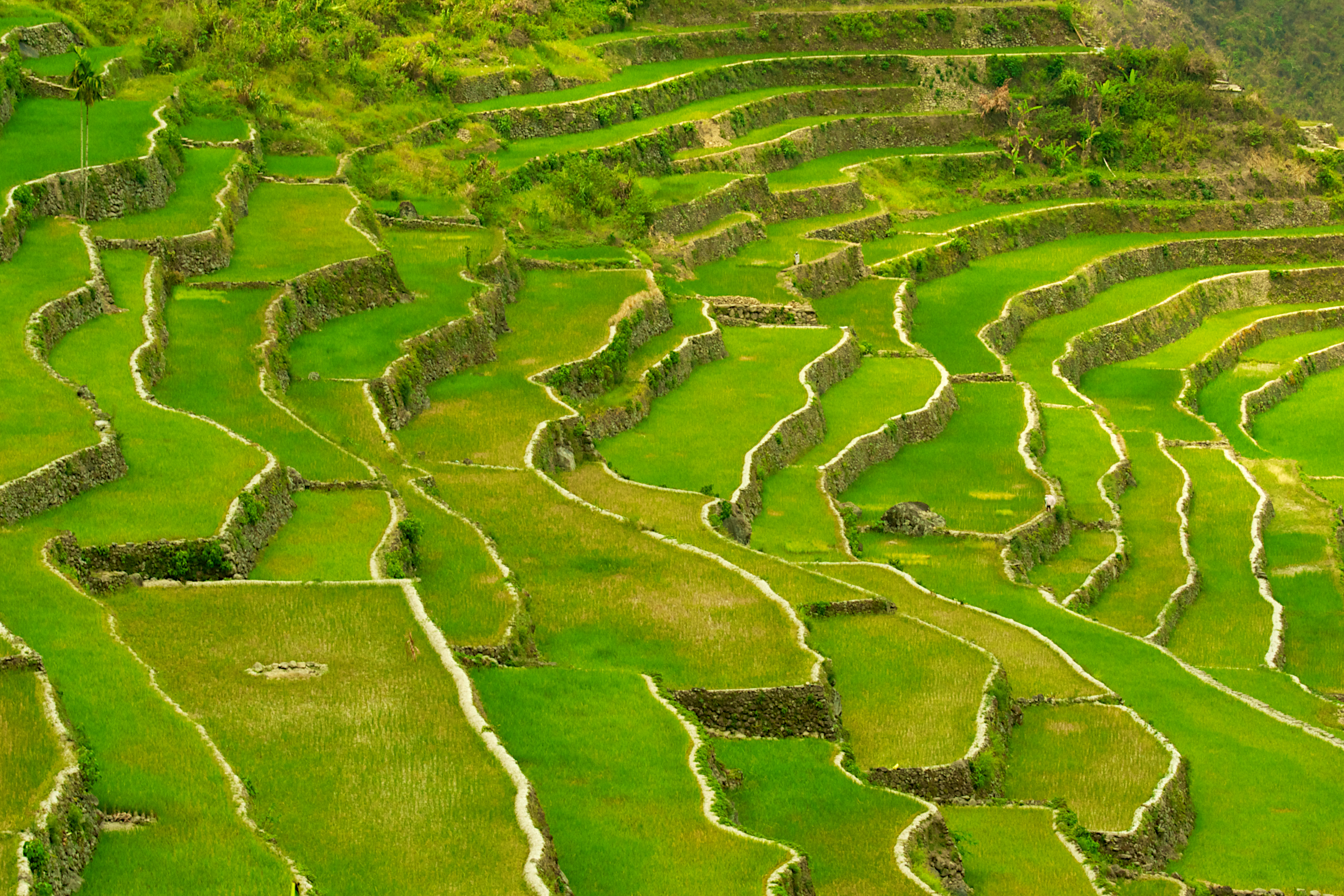
Ifugao Rice Terraces in Batad, UNESCO World Heritage Site

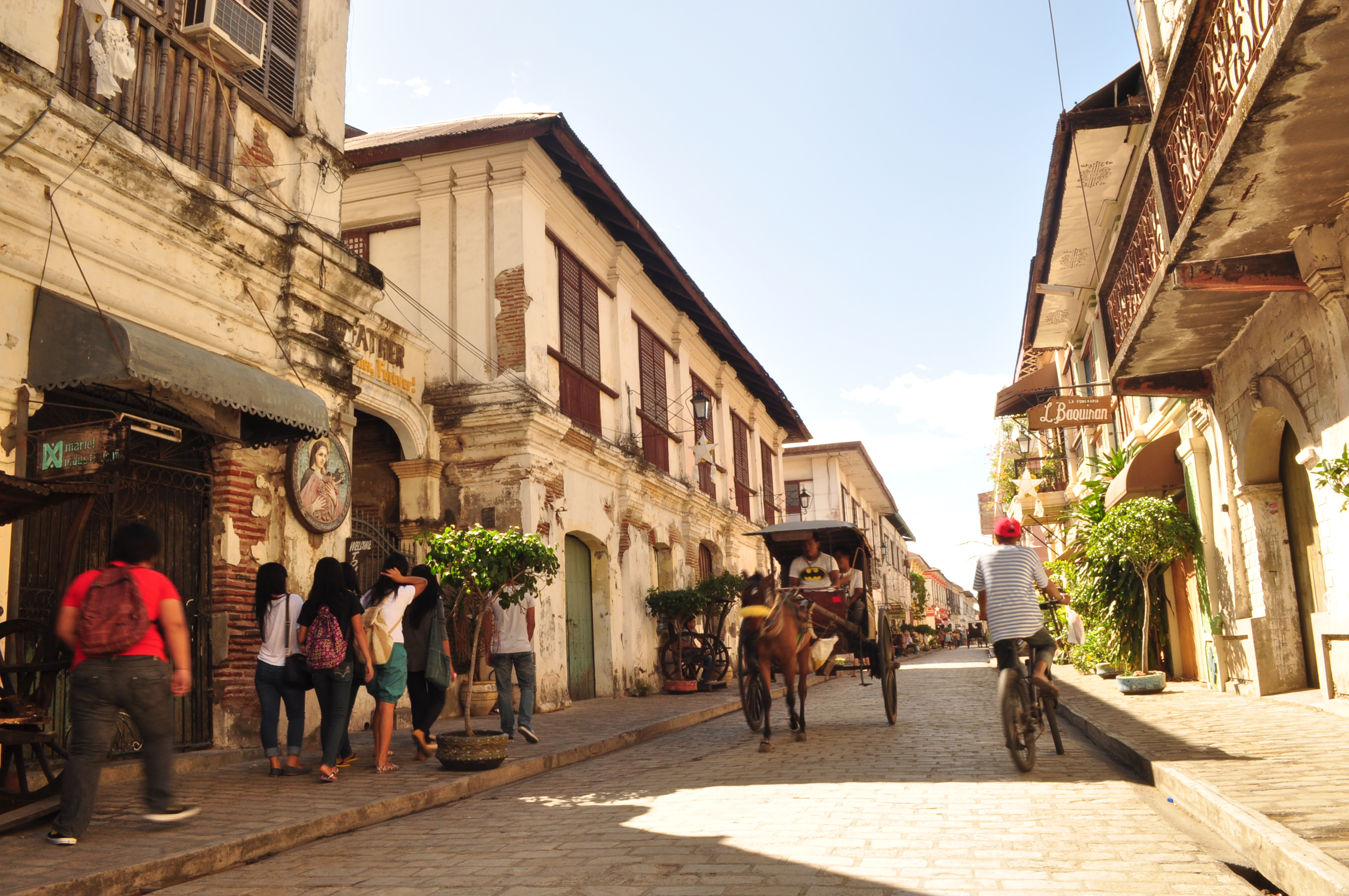
Heritage City of Vigan, UNESCO World Heritage Site and best practice in World Heritage site management

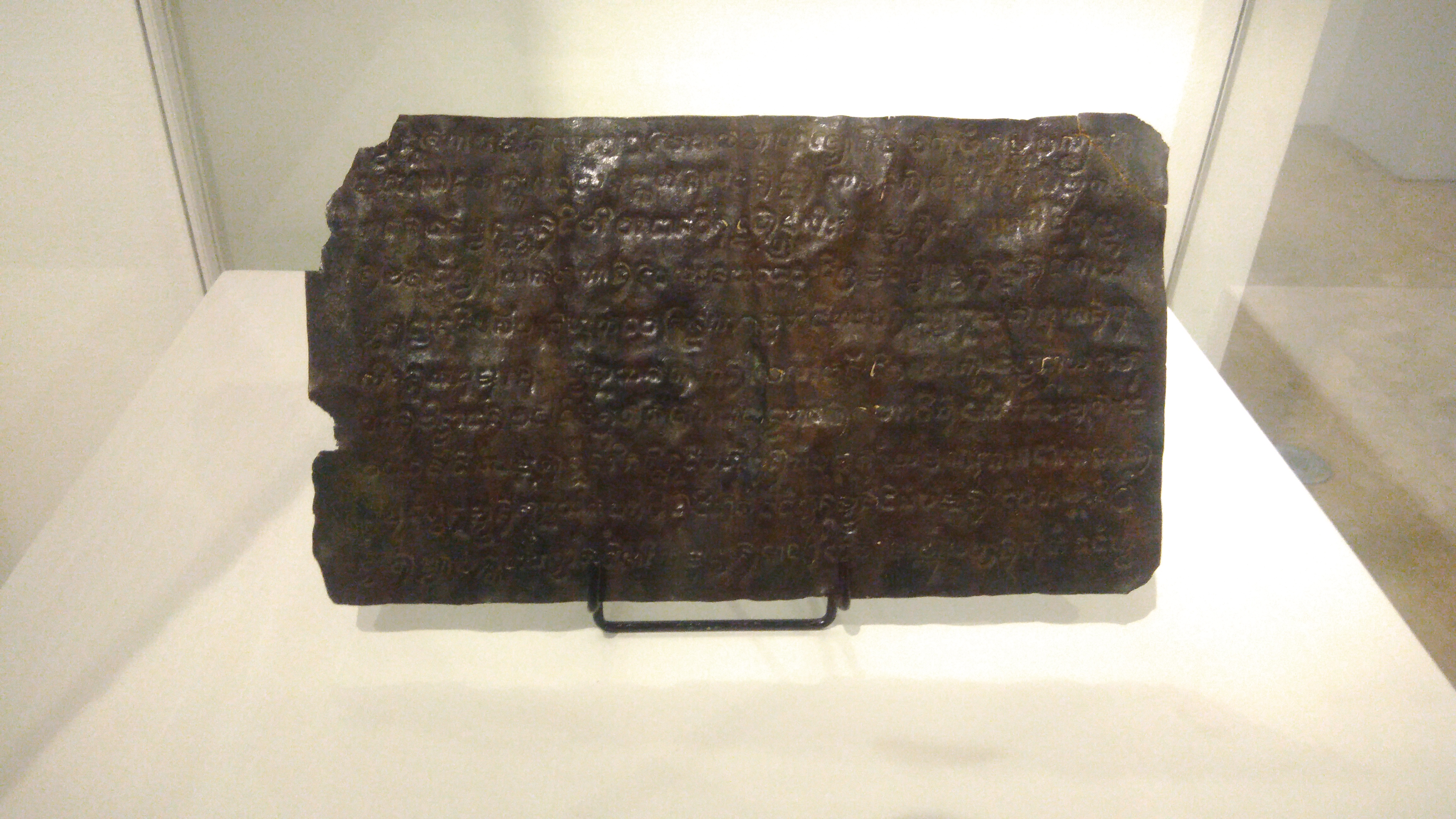
Laguna Copperplate Inscription, the earliest known written document in the Philippines

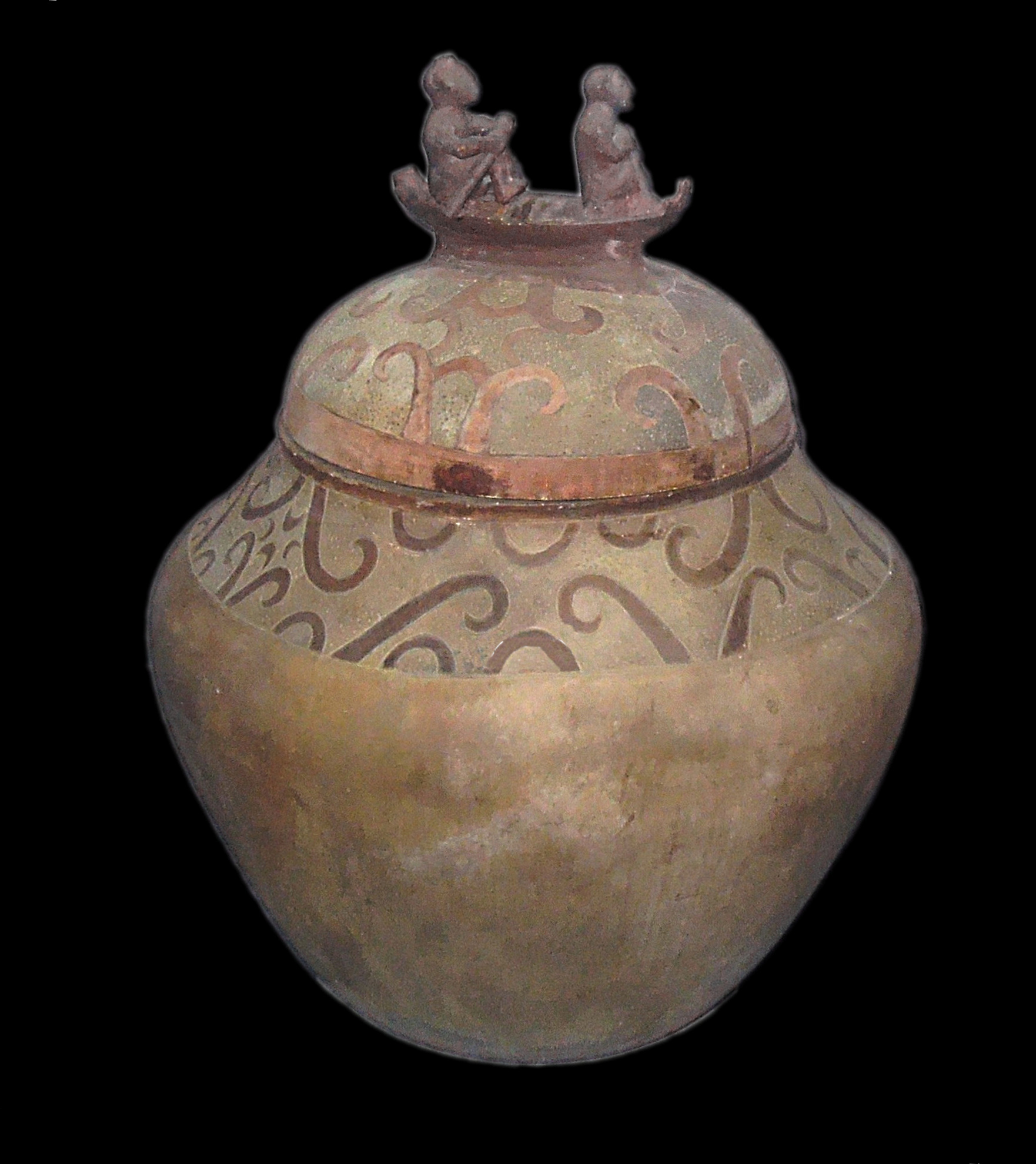
Tabon Cave's Manunggul Jar, the most important burial jar in the Philippines depicting the afterlife in Palawan

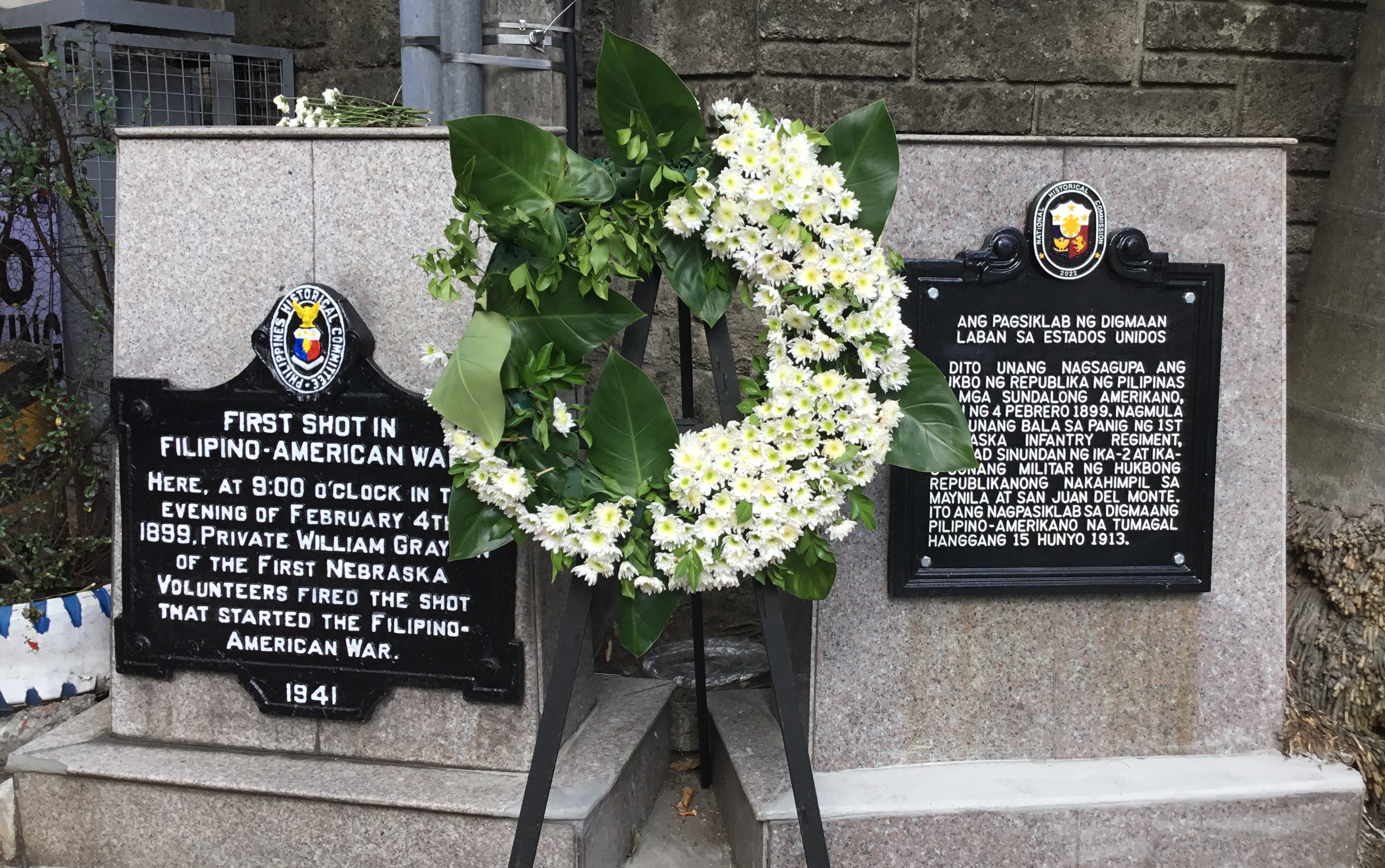
Historical markers on the site of the first shot of the Philippine-American War.

== See also ==
- List of World Heritage Sites in the Philippines
- List of Memory of the World (Documentary) Heritage of the Philippines
- List of National Cultural Treasures in the Philippines
- Philippines National Historical Landmarks
- Important Cultural Property (Philippines)
- Intangible Cultural Heritage of the Philippines
- Historical markers of the Philippines
- Lists of Cultural Properties of the Philippines
- List of National Living Treasures (Gawad ng Manlilika) of the Philippines
- List of National Artists of the Philippines
- Ancestral houses of the Philippines
- National Cultural Heritage Act
- Tourism in the Philippines
