= San Sebastian Church (Manila) =

Roman Catholic church in Manila, Philippines

- Minor Basilica and Parish of Saint Sebastian
- Shrine of Our Lady of Mount Carmel of Saint Sebastian
- Basílika Menor at Parokya ng San Sebastián (Filipino); Basílica Menor de San Sebastián (Spanish)
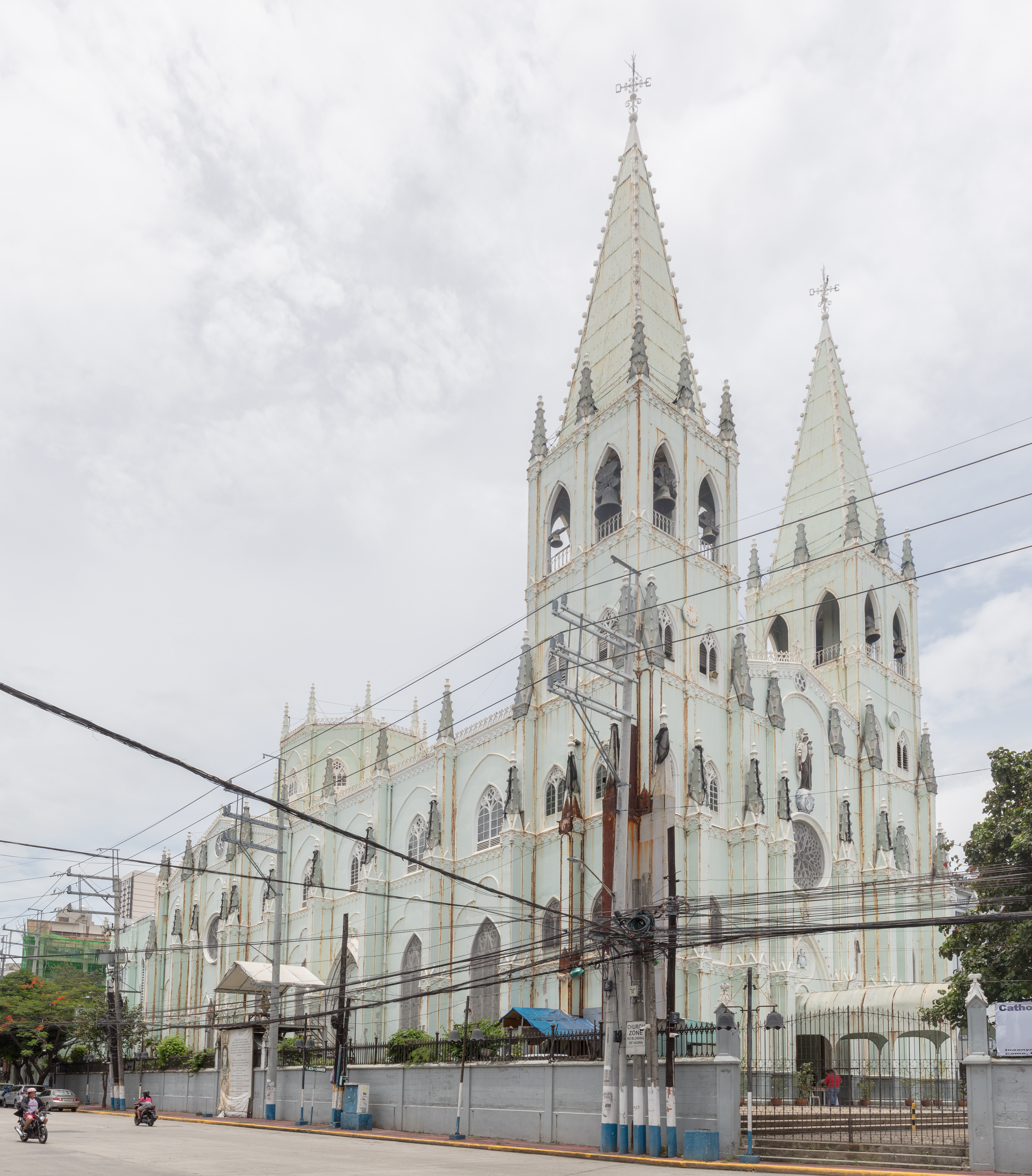
- Main façade in 2023
- San Sebastian Church
- 14°35′59″N 120°59′20″E
- Location: Quiapo, Manila
- Country: Philippines
- Denomination: Roman Catholic
- Religious order: Augustinian Recollects
- Website: San Sebastian Church

History
- Status: Minor basilica
- Founded: 1621; 405 years ago
- Dedication: St. Sebastian and Our Lady of Mount Carmel
- Consecrated: August 16, 1891; 135 years ago

Architecture
- Functional status: Active
- Heritage designation: National Cultural Treasure
- Designated: August 15, 2011
- Architect: D. Genaro Palacios y Guerra
- Architectural type: Basilica
- Style: Neo-Gothic
- Groundbreaking: 1888; 138 years ago
- Completed: August 16, 1891; 135 years ago

Specifications
- Materials: Steel, mixed sand, gravel and cement

Administration
- Archdiocese: Manila
- Deanery: Jose de Trozo
- Parish: San Sebastian

Clergy
- Rector: Rev. Fr. Hector C. Gonzales, OAR
- Vicar(s): Rev. Fr. Joseph D. Granada, OAR
- Priest(s): Rev. Fr. James T. Bumangabang, OAR

National Historical Landmarks
- Official name: Simbahan ng San Sebastian
- Type: House of worship
- Designated: August 1, 1973; 53 years ago
- Legal basis: PD No. 260, s. 1973
- Region: National Capital Region
- Marker date: 1976; 50 years ago

National Cultural Treasures
- Official name: Minor Basilica of San Sebastian
- Designated: August 15, 2011; 15 years ago
- Region: National Capital Region
- Marker date: January 20, 2012; 14 years ago

The Minor Basilica and Parish of Saint Sebastian, (Note: Filipino: Basilika Menor at Parokya ng San Sebastian; Spanish: Basílica Menor de San Sebastián) also known as the Shrine of Our Lady of Mount Carmel of Saint Sebastian and commonly known as San Sebastian Church (Note: Filipino: Simbahan ng San Sebastian) or San Sebastian Basilica, is a minor basilica of the Roman Catholic Church in Manila, Philippines. It is under the jurisdiction of the Archdiocese of Manila.

San Sebastián Church's current structure was completed in 1891, and is noted for its architecture. An example of the Gothic Revival architecture in the Philippines, it is the only steel building church in the Philippines. It was designated as a National Historical Landmark in 1973 and as a National Cultural Treasure in 2011.

San Sebastián Church is under the care of the Order of Augustinian Recollects, who also operate the San Sebastian College-Recoletos adjacent to the basilica. It is located at Plaza del Carmen, near the eastern end of Recto Avenue, in Quiapo, Manila.

== History ==
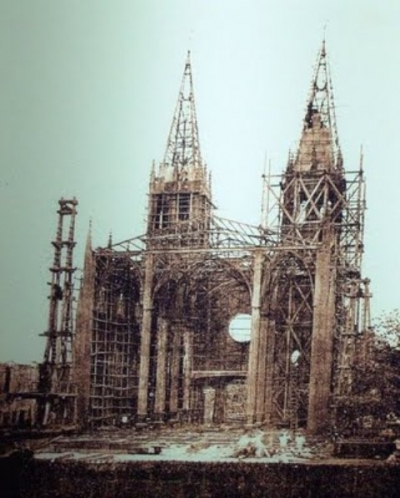
San Sebastian Basilica under construction in 1890

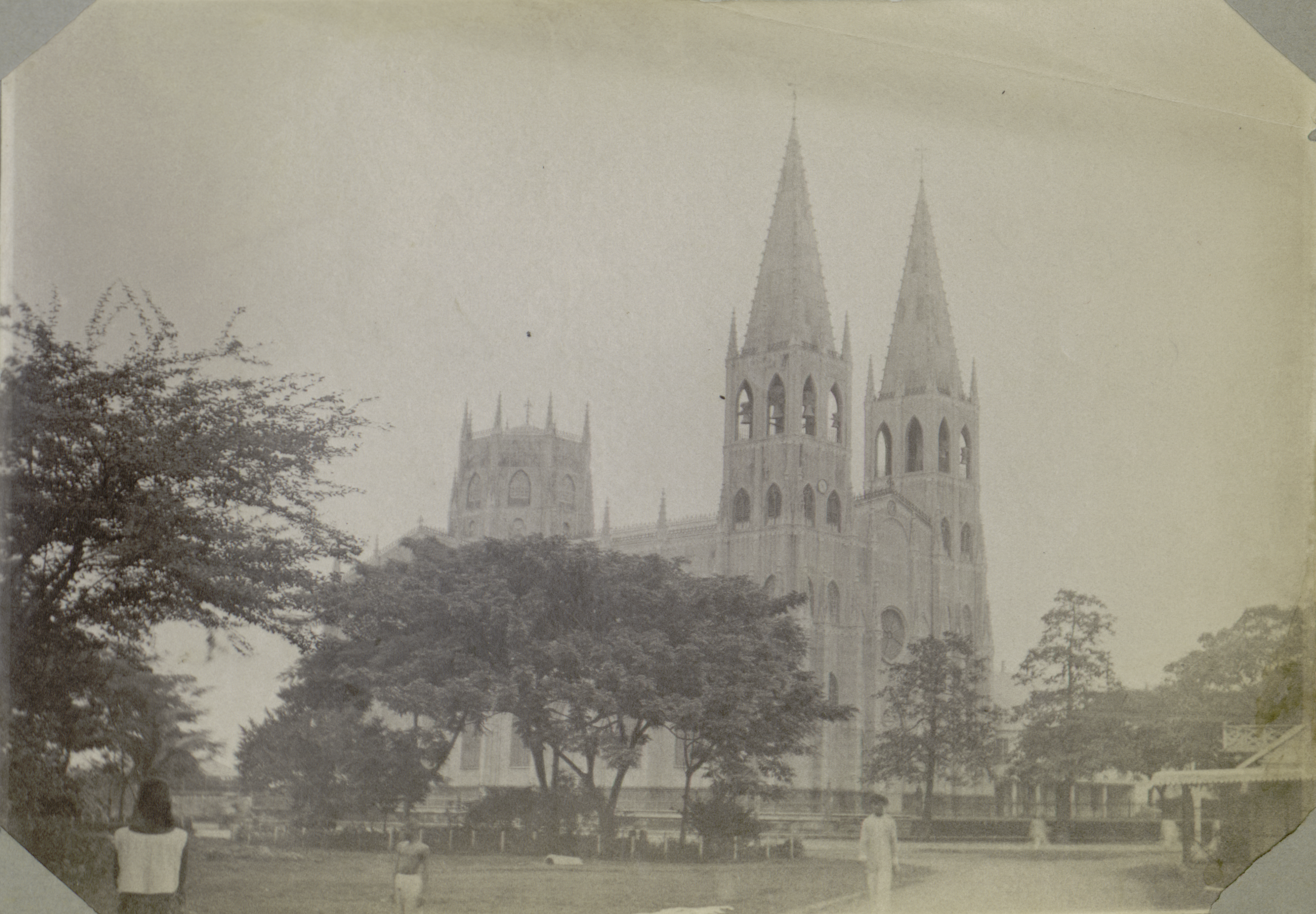
The basilica, c. pre-1900

In 1621, Bernardino Castillo, a generous patron and a devotee of the 3rd-century Roman martyr Saint Sebastian, donated the land upon which the church stands. The original structure of wood had burnt down in 1651 during a Chinese Filipino uprising. Succeeding structures, which were built of brick, were destroyed by fire and earthquakes in 1859, 1863, and 1880.

In the 1880s, Esteban Martínez, the parish priest of the ruined church, approached Spanish architect Genaro Palacios to build a church that can withstand earthquakes. Palacios planned to build a fire and earthquake-resistant structure made entirely of steel. He completed a design that fused Earthquake Baroque with the Neo-Gothic style. His final design was said to have been inspired by the famed Gothic Burgos Cathedral in Burgos, Spain.

=== Construction ===
The prefabricated steel sections that would compose the church were manufactured in Binche, Belgium. According to historian Ambeth Ocampo, the knockdown steel parts were ordered from the Société Anonyme des Entreprises de Travaux Publiques in Brussels. In all, 52 metric tons (51 long tons; 57 short tons) of prefabricated steel sections were transported in eight separate shipments from Belgium to the Philippines, the first shipment arriving in 1888. Belgian engineers supervised the assembly of the church, the first column of which was erected on September 11, 1890. The walls were filled with mixed sand, gravel, and cement. The stained glass windows were imported from the Heinrich Oidtmann Company, a German firm, while local artisans assisted in applying the finishing touches.

The church was raised to the status of a minor basilica by Pope Leo XIII on June 24, 1890. Upon its completion the following year, on August 16, 1891, the Basílica Menor de San Sebastián was consecrated by Bernardino Nozaleda y Villa OP, the 25th archbishop of Manila.

According to Jesús Pastor Paloma, an Augustinian Recollect priest, the structure was also supposed to have a prefabricated retablo (reredos) altar, which was lost at sea when the ship carrying it from Belgium capsized in a storm. A wooden altar was made locally in its stead. Paloma also noted that the bottom part of the church was designed to resemble a ship's hull, so that it would sway during an earthquake.

=== Preservation and restoration ===
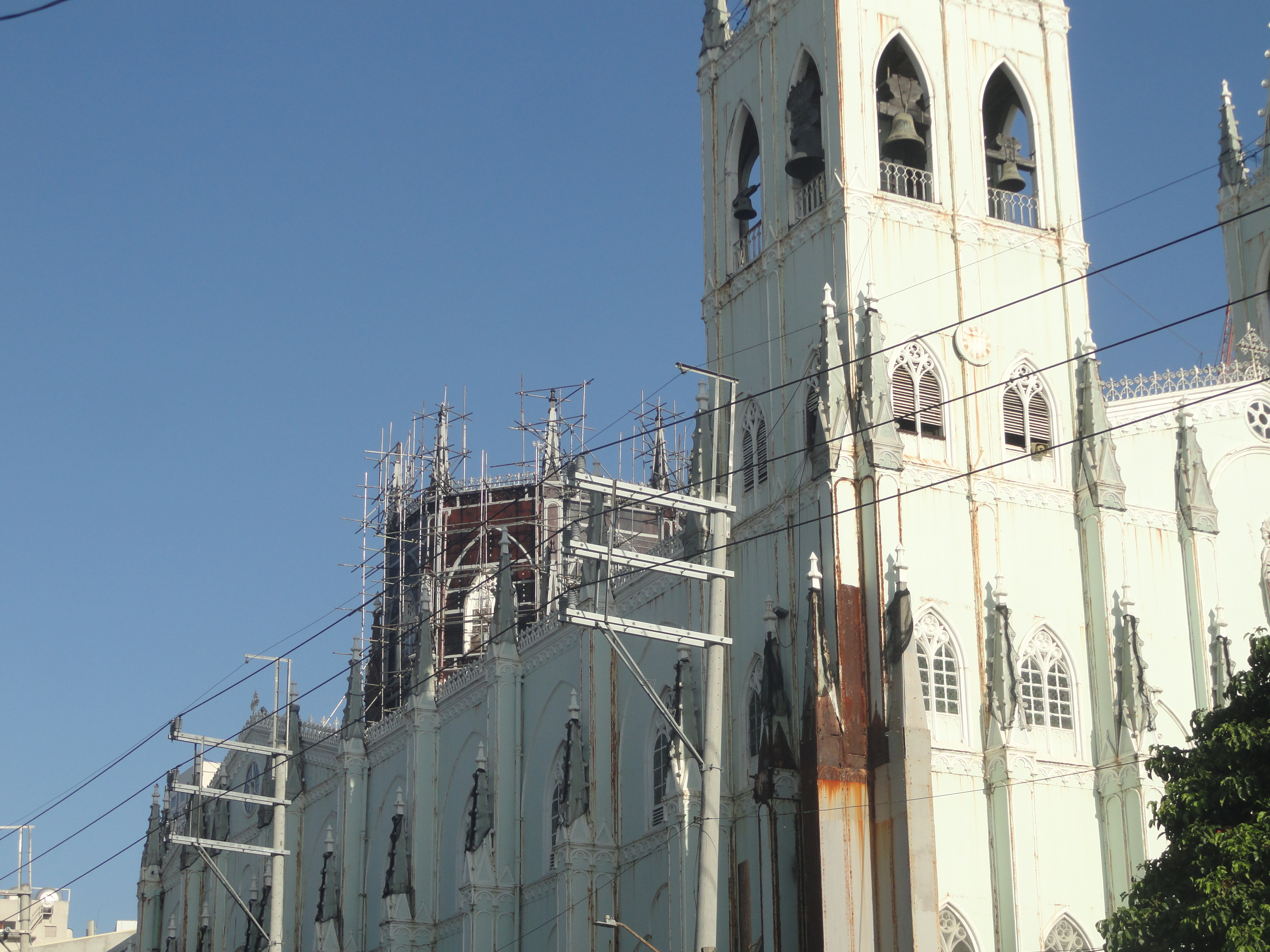
Phase 1 of restoration works, February 2024

In recent years, San Sebastián Church has encountered threats to its structural integrity. The steel structure has been beset by rust and corrosion due to sea breezes from nearby Manila Bay. State funding was accorded to the church through the National Historical Institute which undertook restoration in 1982. The Recollect community has likewise expended funds for the church's maintenance and restoration. In 1998, it was placed on the biennial watchlist of the 100 Most Endangered Sites by the World Monuments Fund, though it was not retained in the subsequent watchlists.

The church was listed again as one of the most endangered monuments in the world by World Monuments Fund in the 2010 World Monuments Watch, along with the Rice Terraces of the Philippine Cordilleras and Santa Maria Church. All sites were delisted in 2011 after the passage of the National Cultural Heritage Act.

The church's restoration has been divided in three key stages: Phase 1 (2023) consisted of treating dome corrosion and repainting; Phase 2 (2025) that focused on waterproofing and repairing the roofing and ridge rolls; and the ongoing Phase 3 (2026) that targets the height-vulnerable belfries and façades.

== Architecture ==
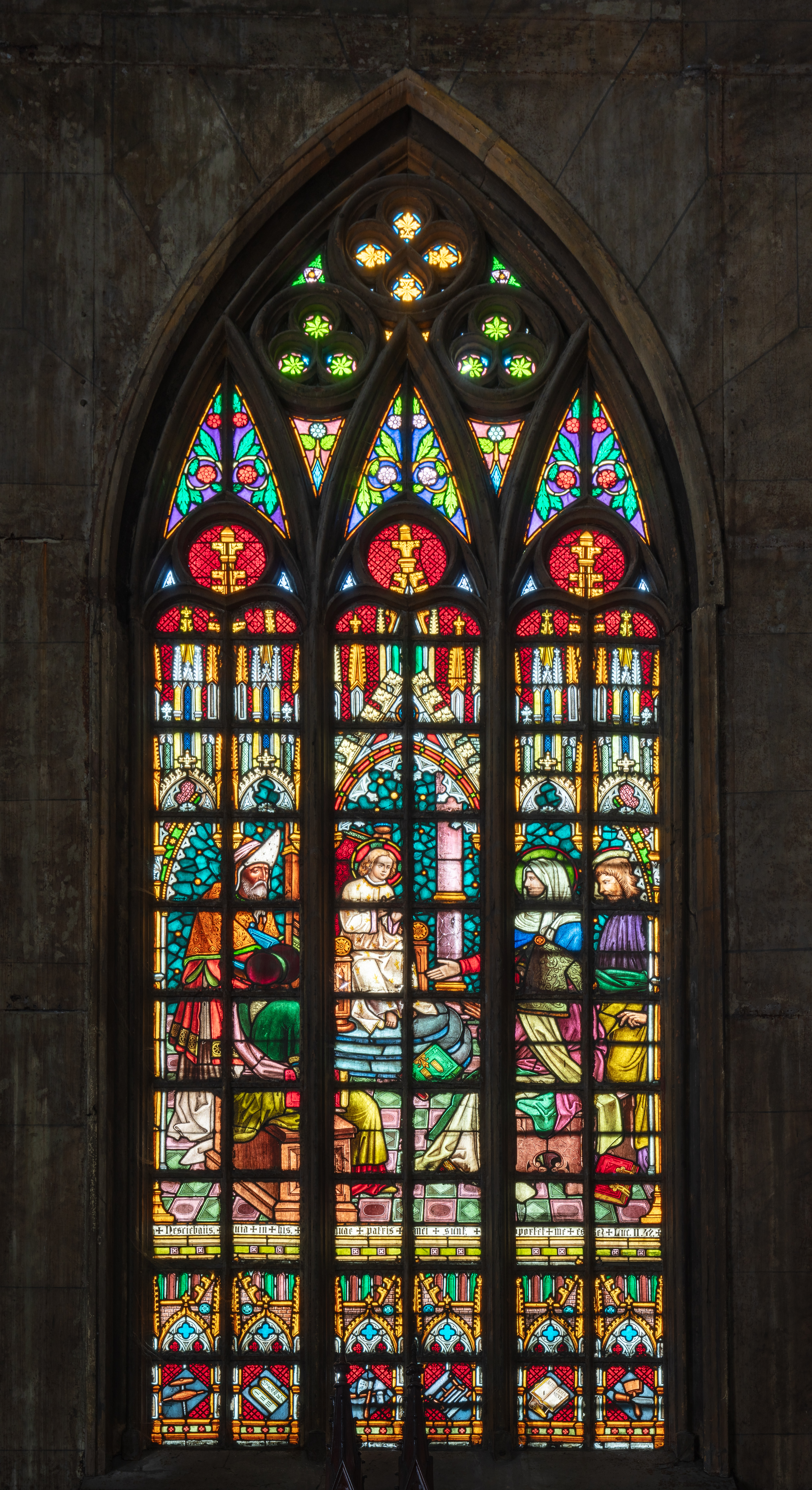
The Finding in the Temple stained glass window manufactured in Germany by the Heinrich Oidtmann Company

San Sebastian Church has two openwork towers and steel vaulting. From its floor, the basilica's nave rises 12 meters (39 ft) to the dome and 32 meters (105 ft) to the tips of the twin spires.

The faux finished interior of the church incorporates groined vaults in the Gothic architecture style permitting very ample illumination from lateral windows. The steel columns, walls and ceiling were painted by Lorenzo Rocha, Isabelo Tampinco and Félix Martínez to give the appearance of marble and jasper. Trompe-l'œil paintings of saints and martyrs by Rocha were used to decorate the interiors of the church. True to the Gothic revival spirit of the church are its confessionals, pulpit, altars and five retablos designed by Lorenzo Guerrero and Rocha. The sculptor Eusebio García carved the statues of holy men and women. Six holy water fonts were constructed for the church, each crafted from marble hewn in Romblon.

Above the main altar is the ivory statue of Our Lady of Mount Carmel, given to the church by Carmelite sisters from Mexico City in 1617. The image withstood all the earthquakes and fires which had destroyed previous incarnations of San Sebastián Church, but its ivory head was stolen in 1975.

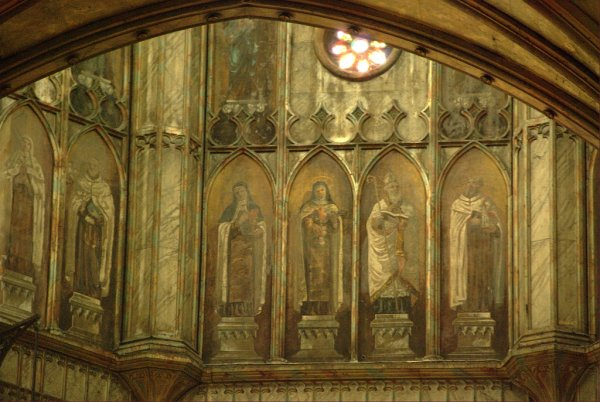
Trompe-l'œil murals of Carmelite saints within the dome's tholobate

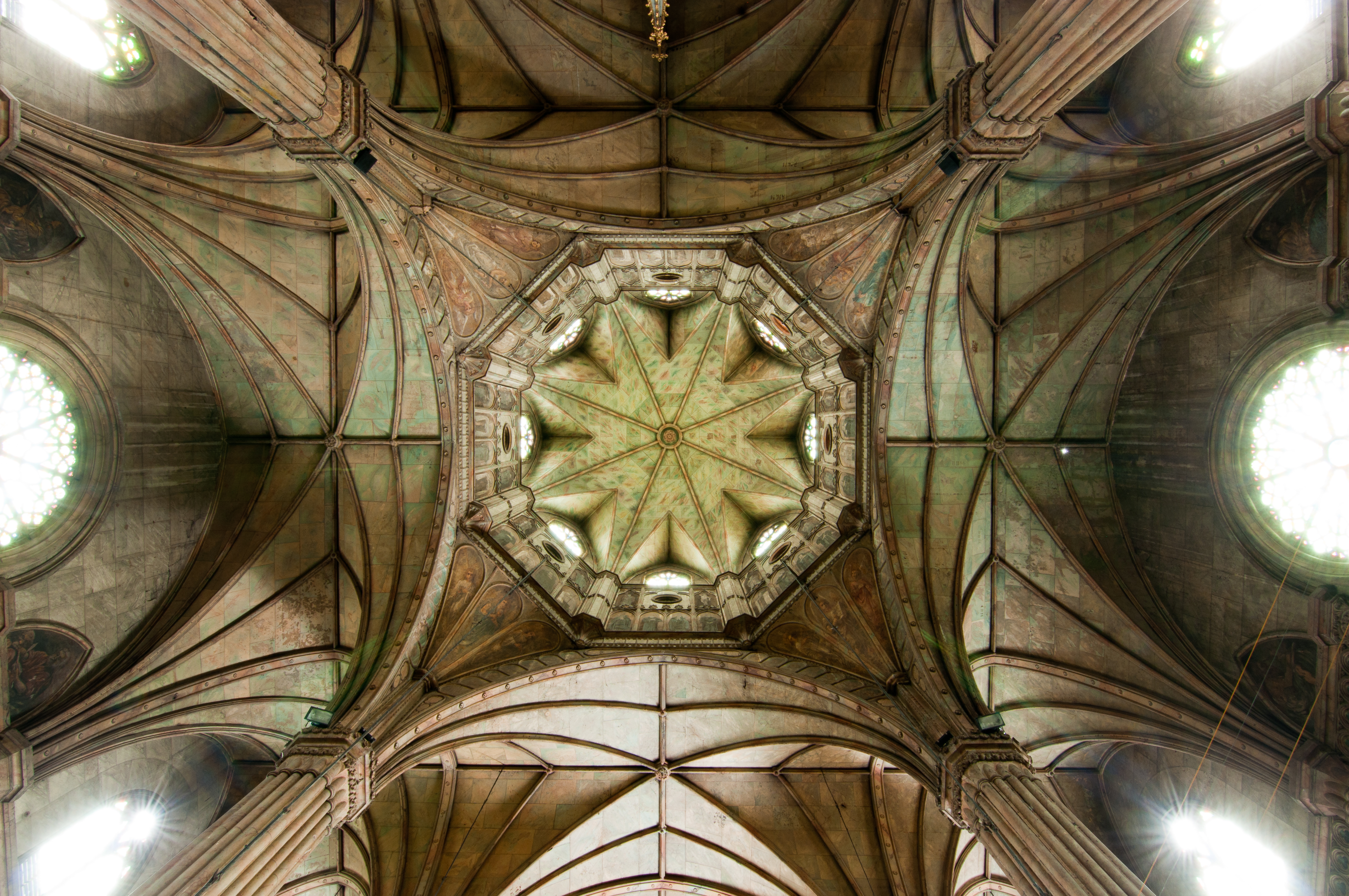
The ceiling and dome of the church, showing the groin vaults

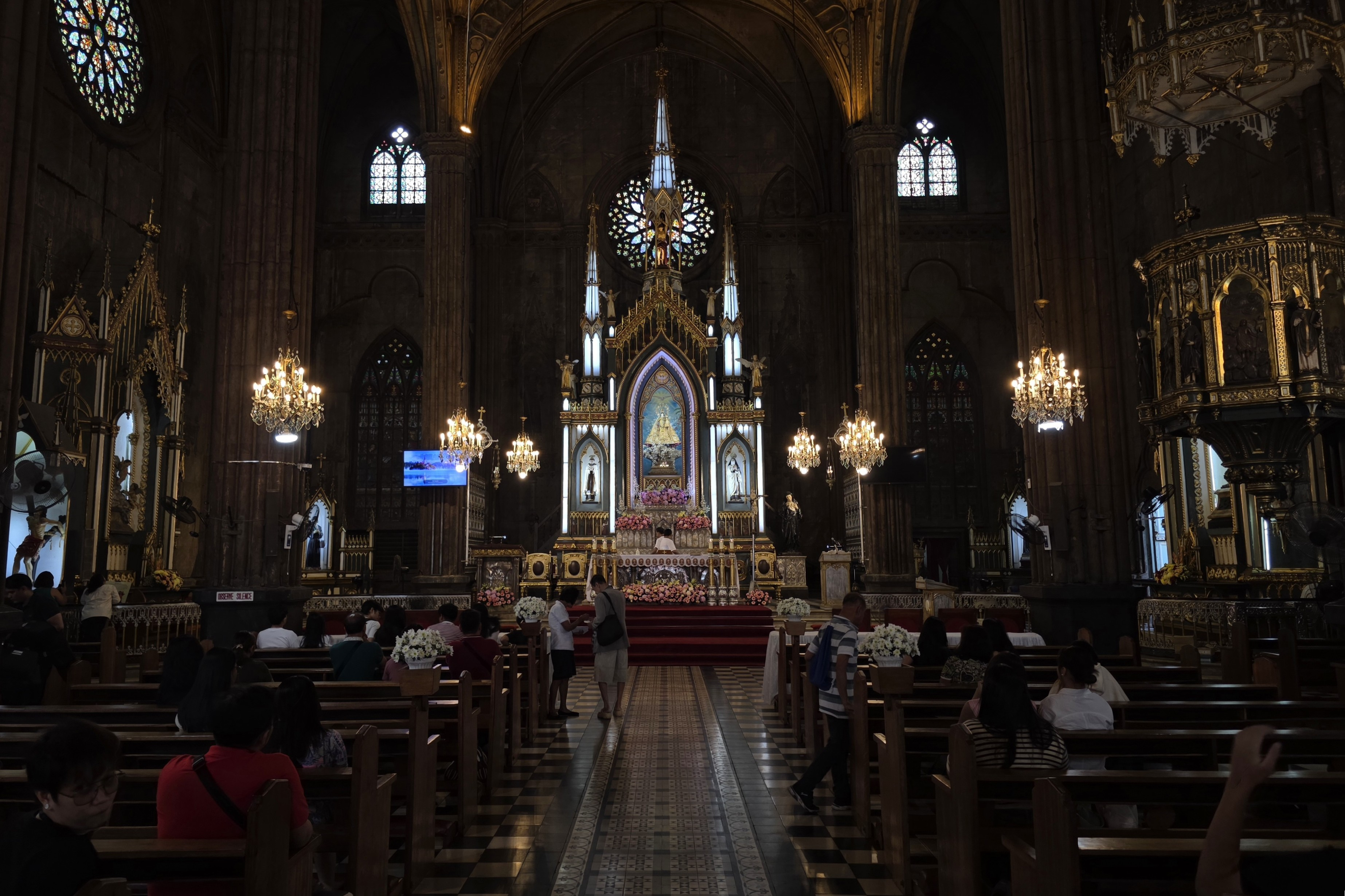
View of the main sanctuary with the high altar, retablo mayor, and pulpit

== Cultural and historical declarations ==
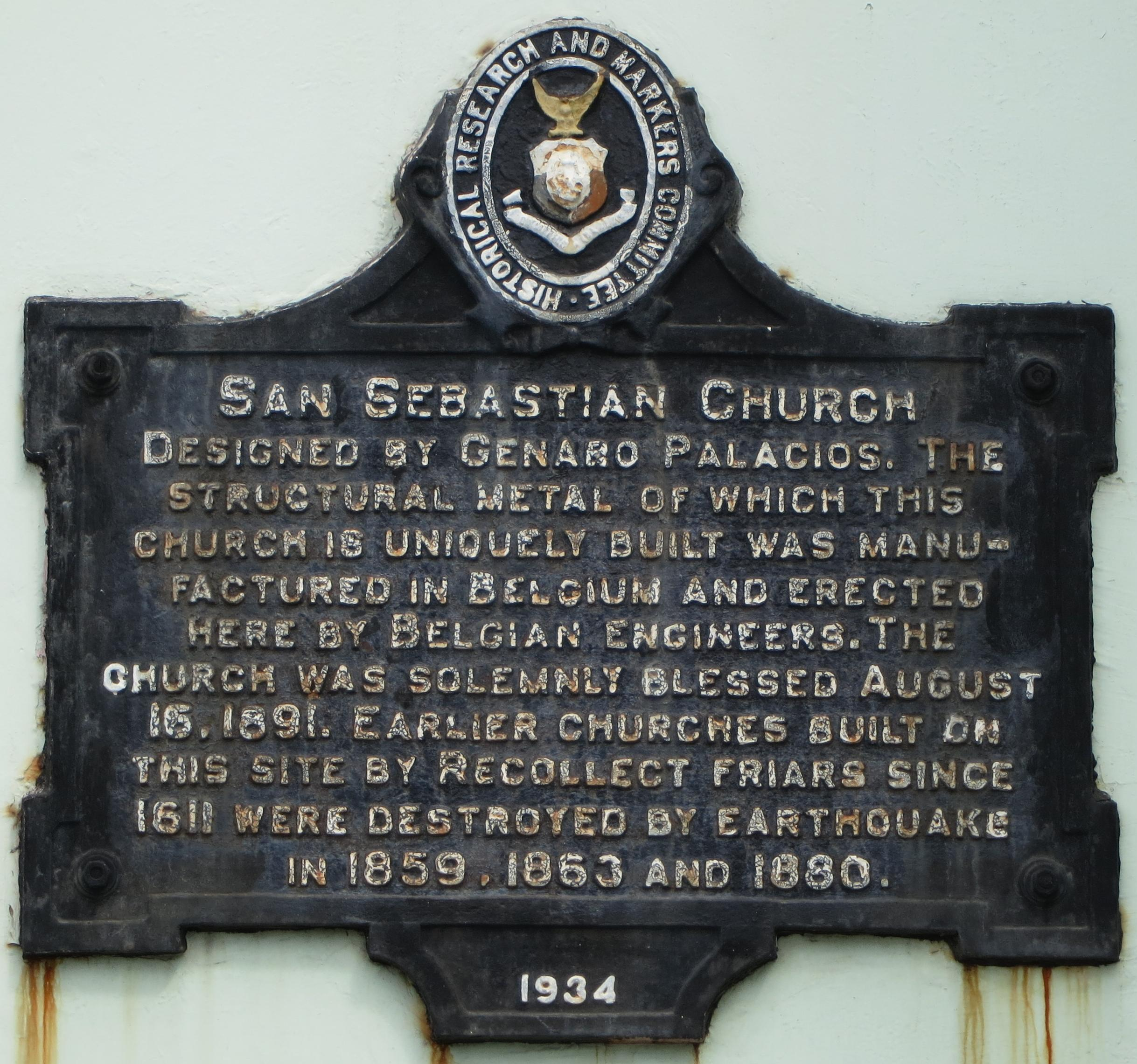
Church HRMC historical marker installed in 1934

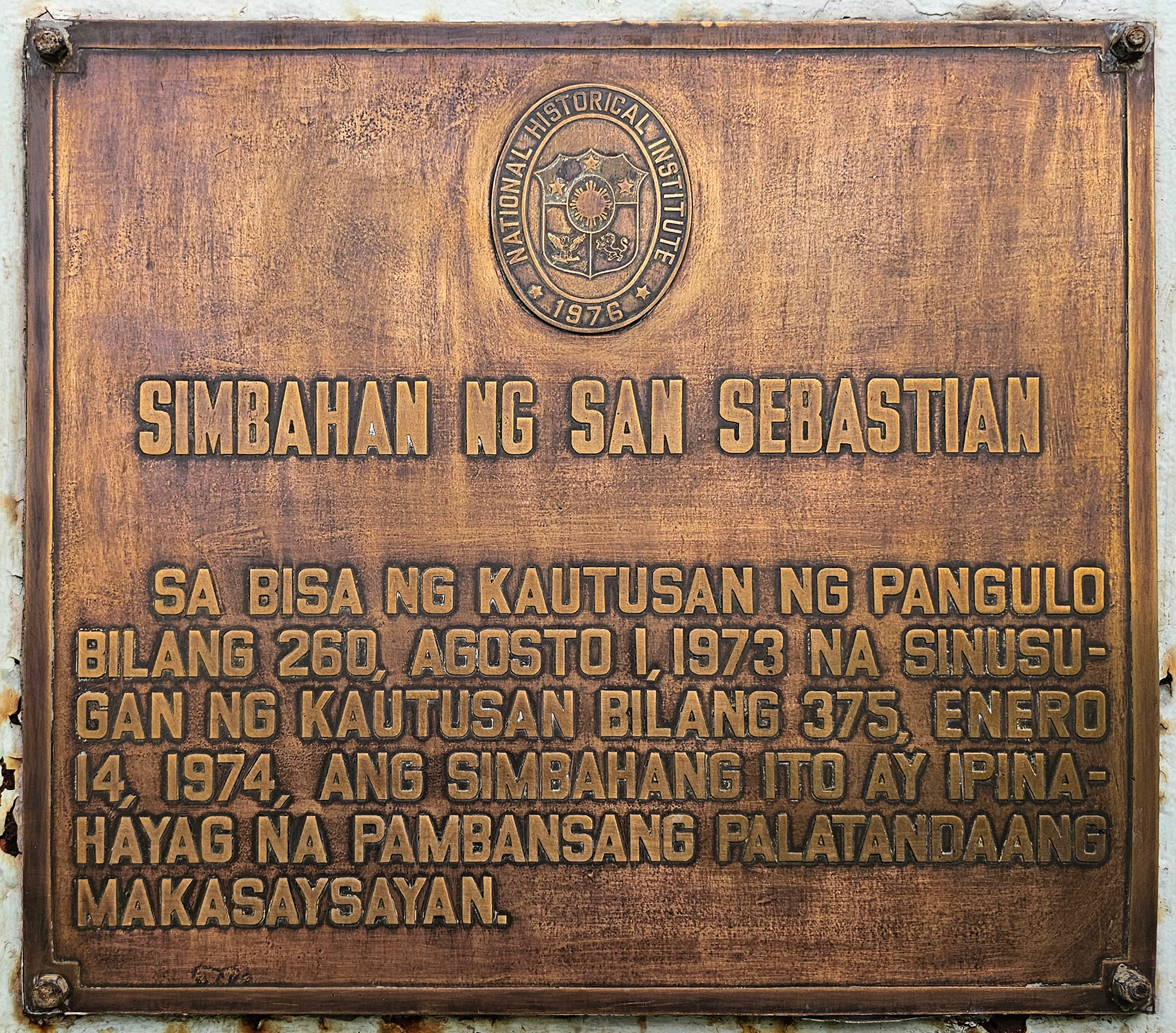
Church NHI historical marker installed in 1976

San Sebastián Church was declared a National Historical Landmark by President Ferdinand Marcos through Presidential Decree No. 260 on August 1, 1973. Subsequently, the church was declared a National Cultural Treasure by the National Museum of the Philippines on August 15, 2011, with the unveiling of the marker on January 20, 2012.

On May 16, 2006, San Sebastián Church was included by the National Historical Institute (now the National Historical Commission of the Philippines) in the Philippines' Tentative List for possible designation as a World Heritage Site, on account of its architectural and historical heritage. As of 2017, the church is no longer included in the Tentative List.

=== Troubled UNESCO re-inclusion ===
On October 1, 2018, it was revealed that a thirty-one-storey residential high-rise building of Summithome Realty Corporation is being planned to be constructed beside the historic San Sebastián Church, negatively affecting the site's possible re-inclusion in the UNESCO tentative list as the area around the church is integral to the site as a 'buffer zone'. The site, the first and only all-steel church in Asia, used to be in the UNESCO tentative list but was removed in 2015 due to structural decay. To re-establish the site's integrity and re-inclusion in the tentative list, it underwent a massive restoration program, which conservationists have cited as a success. However, with the looming threat of the high-rise building, the site's inclusion in the UNESCO list is bleak. Summithome was able to acquire a barangay clearance supporting their application for a building permit from the barangay chairman, without the site managers being initially informed.

== Alleged involvement of Gustave Eiffel ==
It has long been reputed that Gustave Eiffel, the French engineer behind the Eiffel Tower and the steel structure within the Statue of Liberty, was involved in the design and construction of San Sebastián, but this was never confirmed. However, it was confirmed later on that Eiffel was involved in designing and supplying the metal framework for San Ignacio Church in Intramuros, thus confirming the contribution of Eiffel to Philippine church architecture, if not to San Sebastián Church.

== See also ==
- List of Catholic basilicas
- Basilica of the National Shrine of Our Lady of Mount Carmel
- Bamboo Organ
