= Heinrich Oidtmann =

German doctor, stained glass artist, and writer

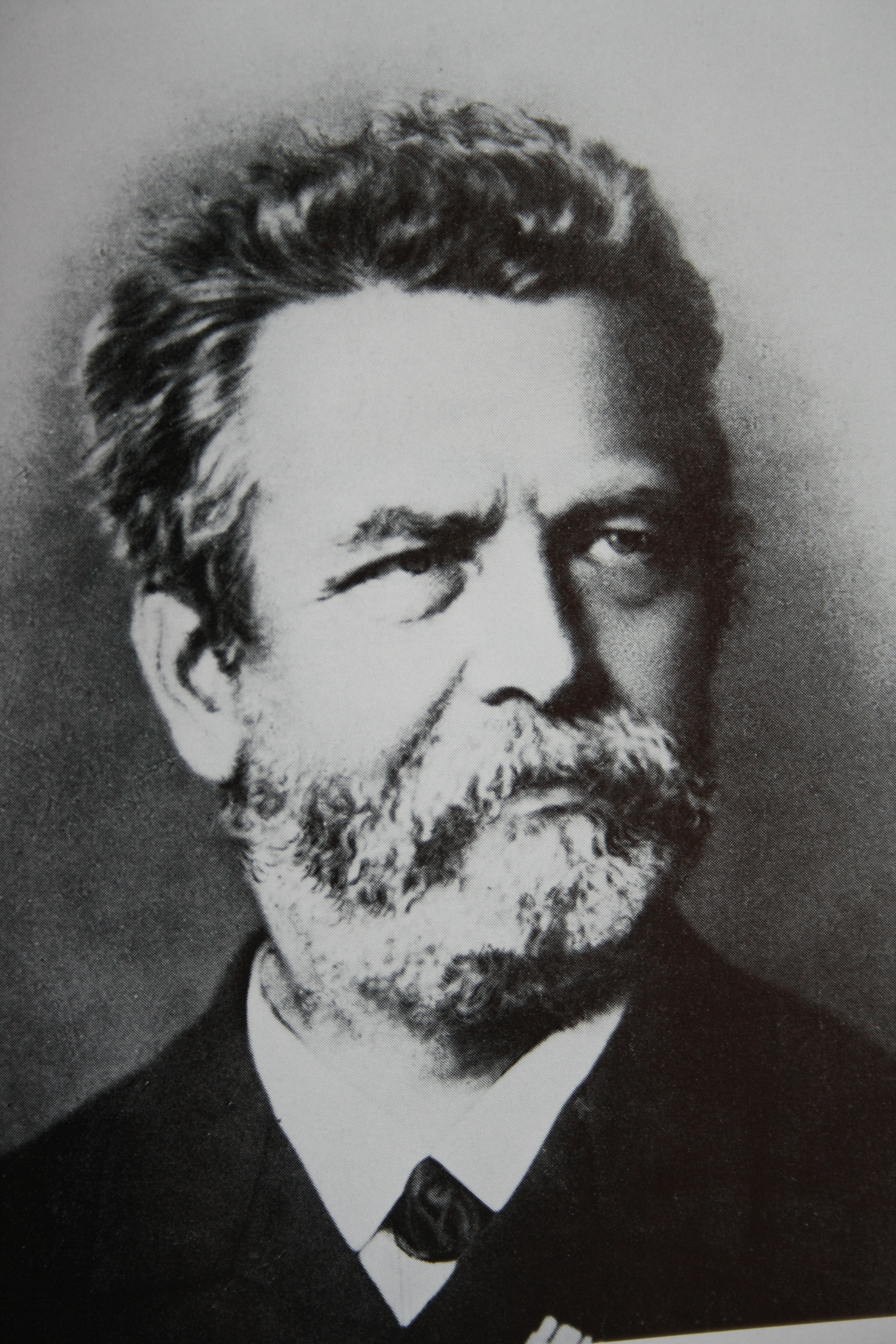
Dr. Heinrich Oidtmann

Heinrich Oidtmann (1838–1890) was a German doctor, stained glass artist, and writer. Oidtman is the namesake of Dr. H. Oidtmann GmbH, the oldest stained-glass workshop in Germany.

== Biography ==
Heinrich Oidtmann started his career as a medical doctor in Linnich, Germany and later established a stained glass workshop. Oidtmann drew inspiration in setting up the workshop from his use of glass slides. His workshop would later grow into the Dr. H. Oidtmann GmbH by the efforts of his descendants.
