= Dr. H. Oidtmann =

Dr. H. Oidtmann GmbH
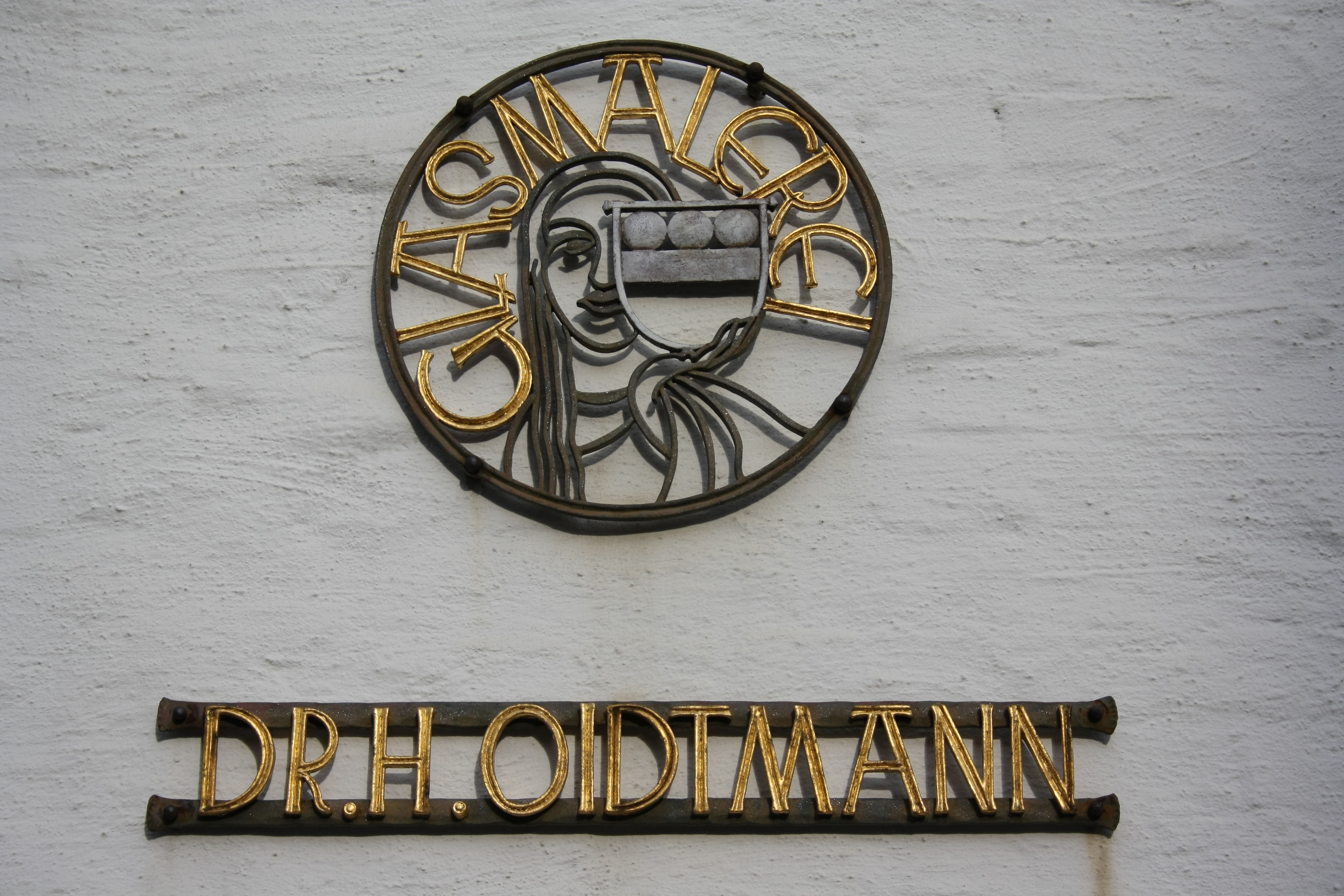
- Native name: Dr. H. Oidtmann GmbH Werkstätten für Glasmalerei, Mosaik und Restaurierungen
- Company type: Gesellschaft mit beschränkter Haftung
- Industry: stained glass
- Founded: 1857 in Linnich, Germany; Incorporated: April 19, 1991
- Founder: Heinrich Oidtmann, M.D.
- Headquarters: Linnich, Germany

Dr. H. Oidtmann GmbH is a Gesellschaft mit beschränkter Haftung based in Linnich, Germany. It is the oldest stained glass workshop in Germany.

== History ==
The first Oidtmann Workshop was first established by Heinrich Oidtmann, M.D. in 1857. The business first started as a sideline for the doctor, due to his inspiration derived from glass slides, but later grew. A catalogue published in 1890 listed the workshop as having 100 employees. The workshops were significantly damaged during World War II and had to be rebuilt during the management of Friedrich and Ludovikus Oidtmann.

The Oidtmann Workshops were registered as a company as Dr. H. Oidtmann GmbH on 19 April 1991 with the registration HRB3724 DÜREN. In 1997 the company became one of the sponsors of the Deutsche Glassmalerei-Museum Linnich.

== Managing Directors ==
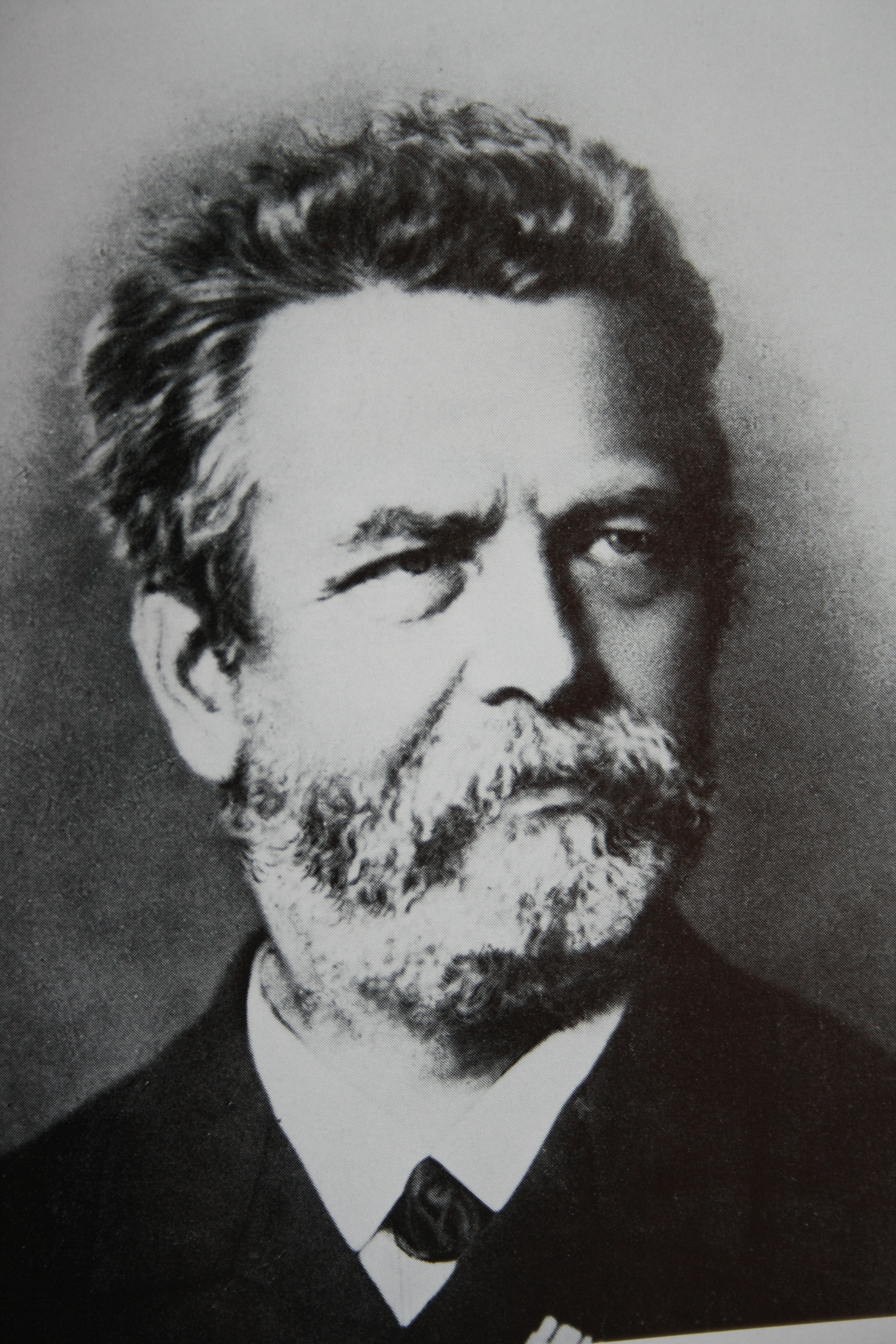
Dr. Heinrich Oidtmann

- Heinrich Oidtmann, M.D.
- Heinrich Oidtmann II, M.D.
- Dipl.-Ing Heinrich Oidtmann III
- Ludovika Oidtmann
- Friedrich Oidtmann and Ludovikus Oidtmann
- Heinrich Oidtmann and Dr. Stefan Oidtmann (present)

== Notable works ==
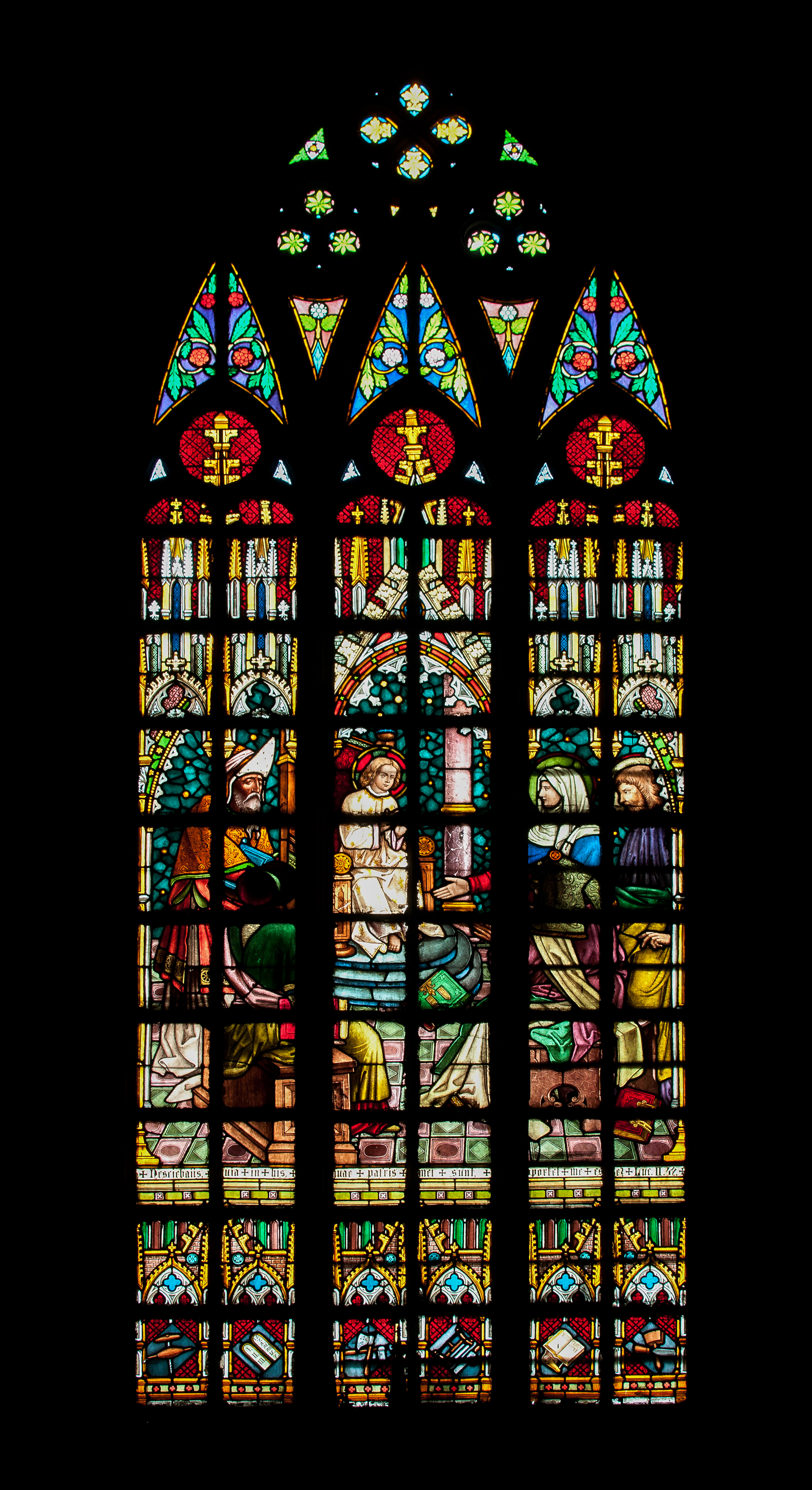
Stained glass at the San Sebastian Church in Manila, Philippines

The Oidtmann Workshops was later known for its execution of works by several prominent designers. Among these works were the stained glass windows of the Saint Marien in Koln-Kalk by Georg Meistermann and stained glass work at Ōmiya Station in Saitama, Japan by Ludwig Schaffrath. The Oidtmann workshop also fabricated the stained glass windows at the San Sebastian Church in Manila, Philippines in 1889.
