= National Cultural Heritage Act =

Law in the Philippines

Congress of the Philippines
- Long title: An Act Providing for the Protection and Conservation of the National Cultural Heritage, Strengthening the National Commission for Culture and the Arts (NCCA) and its affiliated cultural agencies, and for other purposes.
- Citation: Republic Act No. 10066
- Territorial extent: Philippines
- Enacted by: House of Representatives of the Philippines
- Enacted: December 14, 2009
- Enacted by: Senate of the Philippines
- Signed by: Gloria Macapagal Arroyo
- Signed: March 26, 2010
- Commenced: April 10, 2010

Legislative history

Initiating chamber: House of Representatives of the Philippines
- Bill title: House Bill 6733
- Bill citation: An Act Providing for the Protection and Conservation of the National Cultural Heritage, Strengthening the National Cultural Agencies, and for other purposes
- Introduced by: Sonny Angara (Aurora)
- Introduced: August 25, 2009
- First reading: August 26, 2009
- Second reading: August 15, 2009
- Third reading: October 5, 2009

Revising chamber: Senate of the Philippines
- Bill title: An Act Providing for the Protection and Conservation of the National Cultural Heritage, Strengthening the National Commission for Culture and the Arts (NCCA) and its affiliated cultural agencies, and for other purposes.
- Bill citation: Senate Bill 3014
- Received from the House of Representatives of the Philippines: January 26, 2009
- Member(s) in charge: Edgardo Angara
- First reading: January 26, 2009
- Second reading: February 2, 2009
- Third reading: February 9, 2009

Final stages
- Reported from conference committee: November 10, 2009
- Conference committee bill passed by Senate of the Philippines: December 11, 2009

Keywords
- Philippine Registry of Cultural Property, cultural preservation
- Status: In force

The National Cultural Heritage Act, officially designated as Republic Act No. 10066, is a Philippine law that created the Philippine Registry of Cultural Property (PRECUP) and took other steps to preserve historic buildings that are over 50 years old. It was signed into law on March 25, 2009.

It was passed in response to the 2000 demolition of the Manila Jai Alai Building. The Act mentions "archaeological" 18 times, an apparent reference to the destruction of the Huluga archaeological site in 2003.

The Philippine Registry of Cultural Property registers all cultural properties of the country, which the National Commission for Culture and the Arts is mandated to establish and maintain through the appropriate cultural agencies and local governments.

A house that has significant importance to the Filipino culture is declared to be a "Heritage House" by the National Historical Commission of the Philippines (NHCP), previously known as the National Historical Institute. Historical markers are placed on the houses by the commission to indicate their significance, Ancestral homes that have figured in an historic event, house such as the Bonifacio Trial House in Maragondon, Cavite, or houses of national heroes of the Philippines like the Juan Luna Shrine in Badoc, Ilocos Norte, are included among the categories "National Shrines" or "National Historical Landmarks".

The act also requires:

- That for "cultural property declared as Immovable Cultural Property, the appropriate cultural agency shall, after registration, give due notice to the Registry of Deeds having jurisdiction for annotation on the land titles..."
- That "Local government units, through their cultural offices, shall likewise maintain an inventory of cultural property under its jurisdiction and shall furnish the Commission a copy..."
- That "All government agencies and instrumentalities, [ government owned and controlled corporations]...including public and private educational institutions, shall report their ownership and/or possession of such items to the pertinent cultural agency and shall register such properties within three (3) years from the effectivity of this Act."
- That "Private collectors and owners of cultural property shall register such properties, within three (3) years from the effectivity of this Act. The private collectors and owners of cultural property shall not be divested of their possession and ownership...even after registration of said property..." and that information on such private property "shall remain confidential and may be given only upon prior consent of the private owner."

The act defines "cultural property" as "all products of human creativity by which a people and a nation reveal their identity, including churches, mosques and other places of religious worship, schools and natural history specimens and sites, whether public or privately-owned, movable or immovable, and tangible or intangible." It deems all heritage structures, which are at least 50 years old, as presumed important cultural properties despite non-declaration by cultural agencies. Nonetheless, the government mandates all local government units to register these presumed important cultural properties to the database of the National Commission for Culture and the Arts for cultural documentation and conservation.

The citizen retains the ownership of the house; the government is only declaring the heritage value of the structure and providing funding for its protection and preservation.

== See also ==
- List of National Cultural Treasures in the Philippines
- List of historical markers of the Philippines
- List of Cultural Properties of the Philippines
- Ancestral houses of the Philippines
- Suyat
