= List of shipwrecks in 2013 =

The list of shipwrecks in 2013 includes ships sunk, foundered, grounded, or otherwise lost during 2013.

table of contents
2013
Jan	Feb	Mar	Apr
May	Jun	Jul	Aug
Sep	Oct	Nov	Dec
Unknown date

== January ==
=== 3 January ===
List of shipwrecks: 3 January 2013
Ship	State	Description
Zamboanga Ferry	Philippines	The ro-ro ferry ran aground off Dumaguete. All 228 passengers were rescued.

=== 9 January ===
List of shipwrecks: 9 January 2013
Ship	State	Description
Emeline	Indonesia	Cyclone Narelle: The 1979-built 2,485 DWT cement carrier sank in the Flores Sea off Indonesia. Out of the crew of 17, six were rescued from a life raft.

=== 11 January ===
List of shipwrecks: 11 January 2013
Ship	State	Description
Kearsarge	United States	The passenger ship sank while moored at Sunapee Harbor, New Hampshire.
Tirta Samudra XXI	Indonesia	The 2010-built 3,000 DWT coastal tanker sank in the Java Sea in heavy weather. The crew of 15 was saved.

=== 14 January ===
List of shipwrecks: 14 January 2013
Ship	State	Description
Emsstrom; Christos XXII	Germany; Greece	The vessel struck the tugboat Christos XXII, by which she was towed, in the English Channel off Hope's Nose, Devon, United Kingdom. While their ship was holed, all eight crew of Christos XXII were rescued by the Exmouth and Torbay Lifeboats. Emsstrom, which was unmanned, later sank.

=== 15 January ===
List of shipwrecks: 15 January 2013
Ship	State	Description
Sea Blue	North Korea	The 1974-built general cargo ship ran aground off Sharjah due to engine failure. The 3,099 DWT vessel was declared total loss and scrapped on site.

=== 17 January ===
List of shipwrecks: 17 January 2013
Ship	State	Description
USS Guardian	United States Navy	USS Guardian The Avenger-class mine countermeasures ship ran aground on the Tubbataha Reef, in the Sulu Sea about 90 miles south west of Palawan Island, The Philippines. All 79 crew were taken off by USNS Bowditch ( United States Naval Service) and C Champion ( United States Military Sealift Command). The ship was declared a total loss on 28 January. Salvage, and cutting up/removal began in February and concluded on 30 March. Her remains were barged to Japan for final disposal.
Penrith	Marshall Islands	The supply vessel struck a rock and foundered off Mawgyi, Burma. Her crew were rescued.

=== 18 January ===
List of shipwrecks: 18 January 2013
Ship	State	Description
Alican S	Turkey	The cargo ship capsized at Cayeli with the loss of one of her eleven crew.
Seaprobe	United States	The survey vessel foundered in the Gulf of Mexico off Mobile, Alabama. Her twelve crew were rescued.

=== 19 January ===
List of shipwrecks: 19 January 2013
Ship	State	Description
Merle	Gibraltar	The cargo ship was driven ashore at Aveiro, Portugal. Her six crew were rescued by lifeboat.

=== 21 January ===
List of shipwrecks: 21 January 2013
Ship	State	Description
ARA Santísima Trinidad	Argentine Navy	The disused Type 42 destroyer sank while moored at Puerto Belgrano. Refloated December 2015.

=== 26 January ===
List of shipwrecks: 26 January 2013
Ship	State	Description
Tasman Sea	Hong Kong	The bulk carrier ran aground in Tripoli Harbor. Refloated later.

=== 30 January ===
List of shipwrecks: 30 January 2013
Ship	State	Description
Ciudad de Cadiz	France	The cargo ship used for transporting aircraft wings for Airbus was grounded off Mostyn in the River Dee, United Kingdom, after slipping her moorings. She was refloated on 9 February.

=== 31 January ===
List of shipwrecks: 31 January 2013
Ship	State	Description
Baleno 168	Philippines	The ferry suffered a lost propeller and consequently capsized in Calapan. All on board were rescued.

== February ==
=== 4 February ===
List of shipwrecks: 4 February 2013
Ship	State	Description
Petrozavodsk	Russia	The cargo ship ran aground in the Azov-Don Canal She was on a voyage from Rostov-on-Don to a Turkish port.

=== 5 February ===
List of shipwrecks: 5 February 2013
Ship	State	Description
Issyk Kul	Russia	The tugboat was sunk at Nikolayev while towing Nomad Eagle (Turkey) when the freighter went full ahead while the tug still had a tow line to her stern causing the tug to capsize.

=== 7 February ===
List of shipwrecks: 7 February 2013
Ship	State	Description
Setubal Express	Malta	The cargo ship suffered an engine room fire 3 nautical miles (5.6 km) off Al Khums, Libya. She was consequently scrapped.

=== 12 February ===
List of shipwrecks: 12 February 2013
Ship	State	Description
Fortuna	Bahamas	The cargo ship ran aground north of Bandholm, Denmark.

=== 15 February ===
List of shipwrecks: 15 February 2013
Ship	State	Description
Frotamerica	Brazil	The cargo ship ran aground at Lüderitz, Namibia. Shipwreck of Frotamerica 33 km (21 mi) NNE of Lüderitz, Namibia

=== 17 February ===
List of shipwrecks: 17 February 2013
Ship	State	Description
Harita Bauxite	Burma	The 1983-built 52,961 DWT bulk carrier foundered in the South China Sea off Cape Bolinao, Philippines with the loss of fifteen of her crew.

=== 21 February ===
List of shipwrecks: 21 February 2013
Ship	State	Description
Dong Hai No. 1	Cambodia	The cargo ship foundered off the coast of Japan with the loss of three of her twelve crew. Survivors were rescued by Japanese Navy helicopters.

=== 23 February ===
List of shipwrecks: 23 February 2013
Ship	State	Description
Fajar Samudera	Malaysia	The ferry sank at Port Klang.

=== 27 February ===
List of shipwrecks: 27 February 2013
Ship	State	Description
Fuhan 89, Yong De Sheng 168	China	The cargo ships collided in the Minjiang River. Both vessels sank; eight of the ten crew of Yong De Sheng 168 were killed.

=== Unknown date ===
List of shipwrecks: Unknown date 2013
Ship	State	Description
Lyubov Orlova	Cook Islands	The cruise ship, which was derelict in the Atlantic Ocean, is thought to have foundered towards the end of the month.

== March ==
=== 6 March ===
List of shipwrecks: 6 March 2013
Ship	State	Description
Nikolay Bauman	Moldova	The cargo ship foundered in the Black Sea 12 nautical miles (22 km) off the mouth of the Danube. Her eleven crew were rescued.

=== 7 March ===
List of shipwrecks: 7 March 2013
Ship	State	Description
Justice	United States	The tug sank in the Mississippi near New Orleans, Louisiana.

=== 9 March ===
List of shipwrecks: 9 March 2013
Ship	State	Description
Budi Jasa 18	Indonesia	The coaster collided with the ferry Sea Hawk (Singapore) and sank in the West Keppel Fairway. One of her six crew was reported missing.

=== 10 March ===
List of shipwrecks: 10 March 2013
Ship	State	Description
FM Express	Colombia	The cargo ship was destroyed by fire off Bocas de Cenizas. Her eight crew were rescued.

=== 11 March ===
List of shipwrecks: 11 March 2013
Ship	State	Description
Maria Angelica Grace	Philippines	The ro-ro cargo ship capsized and sank near Mandaue. All 25 people on board survived.

=== 16 March ===
List of shipwrecks: 16 March 2013
Ship	State	Description
Danio	Antigua and Barbuda	The cargo ship ran aground off the Farne Islands, Northumberland, United Kingdom. Danio was refloated on 28 March. She was later repaired and returned to service.

=== 18 March ===
List of shipwrecks: 18 March 2013
Ship	State	Description
Guang Yang Xin Gang	China	The container ship capsized and sank in the East China Sea 40 nautical miles (74 km) off Longkou with the loss of at least eleven of her fourteen crew. One survivor was reported to have been rescued with the other two crew members reported as missing as of 18 March 2013.
Hong Xiang 29	China	The cargo ship capsized and sank in Bohai Bay off Longkou with the loss of thirteen of her fourteen crew.

=== 19 March ===
List of shipwrecks: 19 March 2013
Ship	State	Description
Vinacomin 03	Vietnam	The cargo ship collided with Vinacomin 02 (Vietnam) in the Gulf of Tonkin and sank. All fourteen crew were rescued.

=== 24 March ===
List of shipwrecks: 24 March 2013
Ship	State	Description
Minguang 68	China	The cargo ship collided with Jian Chang (Taiwan) in the Taiwan Strait and was severely damaged. She was abandoned by her twelve crew.
Unnamed		The vessel, carrying asylum seekers, sank 14 nautical miles (26 km) north-west of Christmas Island.

=== 30 March ===
List of shipwrecks: 30 March 2013
Ship	State	Description
Atlantik Confidence	Liberia	In the early morning of 30 March, the bulk carrier Atlantik Confidence had a fire in its engine room and partially sank off Oman. The crew abandoned ship after the fire got out of control and the NATO Task force fighting piracy off the Horn of Africa sent its nearest vessel, USS Nicholas (United States Navy), to assist. Survivors were reported to have transferred to YM Pluto (Malta), an oil tanker in the area.

== April ==
=== 2 April ===
List of shipwrecks: 2 April 2013
Ship	State	Description
Sabret	Turkey	The passenger ferry caught fire in the Marmara Sea off Istanbul. Her passengers and crew were transferred to Caddebostan (Turkey). Several people were injured.

=== 7 April ===
List of shipwrecks: April 2013
Ship	State	Description
Little Debbie	United States	The tug sank in Guantanamo Bay.

=== 8 April ===
List of shipwrecks: 8 April 2013
Ship	State	Description
Min Long Yu	China	The fishing vessel ran aground on the Tubbataha Reef, the same reef as USS Guardian (above). It was pulled off the reef on 19 April 2013 and was checked for damage before being towed to Puerto Princesa City where the vessel was inspected.
Chang Fu 6	China	The bulk carrier collided with the bulk carrier Tai Hang 118 (China) and probably sank in the Yangtze River at Shanghai.

=== 12 April ===
List of shipwrecks: 12 April 2013
Ship	State	Description
Ivan Shchpetov	Russia	The cargo ship ran aground in the Isefjord. She was refloated on 16 April with assistance from Susanne A (Denmark).

=== 13 April ===
List of shipwrecks: 13 April 2013
Ship	State	Description
Celtic Endeavour	Cook Islands	The cargo ship ran aground in the River Trent at Groveport, Lincolnshire, United Kingdom. She was refloated on 24 April.
Delta Captain	United States	The tug foundered in the Pacific Ocean 13 nautical miles (24 km) west of Point Sur, California. All four crew were rescued by the United States Coast Guard.

=== 14 April ===
List of shipwrecks: 14 April 2013
Ship	State	Description
Tian Yun	Panama	The cargo ship foundered in the South China Sea off Busan, South Korea. Her seventeen crew were rescued.

=== 17 April ===
List of shipwrecks: 17 April 2013
Ship	State	Description
Kai Xin	China	The fish factory ship caught fire in the Southern Ocean off the coast of Antarctica. All 90 crew were rescued by the fishing vessel Juvel (Norway). Kai Xin was taken in tow by a Chilean Navy tug. She foundered on 21 April.

=== 25 April ===
List of shipwrecks: 25 April 2013
Ship	State	Description
Carnival Triumph	Bahamas	The Destiny-class cruise ship was abandoned by her 1,000-plus crew after two fuel barges exploded and caught fire at Mobile, Alabama, United States. Three barge crew were injured. The ship was not damaged and departed for Freeport, Bahamas on 8 May 2013.

=== 28 April ===
List of shipwrecks: 28 April 2013
Ship	State	Description
Myang-Aung	Burma	The tanker collided with Malacca Highway (Panama) in the Yangon River. She capsized and sank. Her seventeen crew were rescued.

=== 29 April ===
List of shipwrecks: 29 April 2013
Ship	State	Description
Pirireis	Cook Islands	The cargo vessel sank after colliding with freighter ConSouth (Antigua and Barbuda) 8 nautical miles (15 km) south west of Methoni, Peloponnese. The bodies of two crew members were recovered by the Greek coast guard while eight crew members from the Pirireis are missing. The other vessel, ConSouth, suffered minor damage, and the entire crew of the vessel is safe.

== May ==
=== 3 May ===
List of shipwrecks: 3 May 2013
Ship	State	Description
Lam Hong 26	Vietnam	The cargo ship foundered in the Gulf of Tonkin off Hai Phong. Her eight crew were rescued.

=== 7 May ===
List of shipwrecks: 7 May 2013
Ship	State	Description
Jolly Nero	Italy	The 240-metre (790 ft) cargo ship crashed into the harbour control tower at the Port of Genoa, Italy, killing at least seven people.

=== 12 May ===
List of shipwrecks: 12 May 2013
Ship	State	Description
Xin Chuan 8	China	The cargo ship collided with a bridge near Nanching and sank in the Yangtze River. Her eighteen crew were rescued.

=== 26 May ===
List of shipwrecks: 26 May 2013
Ship	State	Description
Jascon 4	Saint Vincent and the Grenadines	The tug foundered off the coast of Nigeria. Eleven of the 12 crew were lost; a single survivor was rescued by divers from the submerged wreck after three days underwater.
The Lulu	Unknown	The retired 271-foot (83 m) cargo ship, most recently operated as Yokamu (flag unknown) but renamed The Lulu for her sinking, was scuttled in approximately 110 feet (34 m) of water in the Gulf of Mexico 17 nautical miles (31 km; 20 mi) south of Perdido Pass, Orange Beach, Alabama, at 29°59′50″N 087°33′00″W to form an artificial reef.

=== 28 May ===
List of shipwrecks: 28 May 2013
Ship	State	Description
Pernfung 2	Thailand	The passenger ferry was beached on Keaw Island. Her 115 passengers were rescued by Pichanon (Thailand).

=== 30 May ===
List of shipwrecks: 30 May 2013
Ship	State	Description
Georg Büchner	Germany	The 153-metre (502 ft) former hotel ship sank off Poland while it was being towed from Rostock, Germany to Klaipėda, Lithuania, for scrapping.

== June ==
=== 4 June ===
List of shipwrecks: 4 June 2013
Ship	State	Description
Matthew I	Georgia	Matthew I sinking. The cargo ship, suspected of cocaine smuggling, was scuttled when intercepted by HNLMS Holland (Royal Netherlands Navy) in the Caribbean Sea.
Nina	United States	The schooner was reported to be 370 nautical miles (690 km) west of New Zealand. No further trace, presumed foundered with the loss of all seven crew. She was on a voyage from Opua, New Zealand to Newcastle, New South Wales, Australia.

=== 7 June ===
List of shipwrecks: 7 June 2013
Ship	State	Description
Unnamed		An aircraft spotted the submerged hull of a ship north of Christmas Island, which was carrying at least fifty-five asylum seekers.

=== 10 June ===
List of shipwrecks: 10 June 2013
Ship	State	Description
North Tug	Norway	The tugboat capsized and sank while assisting the cruise ship Ocean Princess (Bermuda). The crew of two escaped without injuries.

=== 11 June ===
List of shipwrecks: 11 June 2013
Ship	State	Description
HDMS Ejnar Mikkelsen	Royal Danish Navy	The Knud Rasmussen-class patrol vessel ran aground in the Julianehåb Fjord and was seriously damaged.

=== 13 June ===
List of shipwrecks: 13 June 2013
Ship	State	Description
Asian Express	Maldives	The cargo ship suffered structural failure of her hull and foundered in the Indian Ocean off the Lackshadweep Islands, India. Her 22 crew were rescued by IGCS Varuna (Indian Coast Guard).

=== 14 June ===
List of shipwrecks: 14 June 2013
Ship	State	Description
Celeste Ann	United States	The supply vessel collided with an oil rig in the Gulf of Mexico off Plaquemines Parish, Louisiana and sank. All 23 people on board were rescued.
Our Lady of Mount Carmel	Philippines	The ferry foundered off Masbate with the loss of seven lives.

=== 15 June ===
List of shipwrecks: 15 June 2013
Ship	State	Description
NRP Comandante Hermenegildo Capelo	Portuguese Navy	The decommissioned frigate was scuttled as an artificial reef near Portimão, Portugal.

=== 17 June ===
List of shipwrecks: 17 June 2013
Ship	State	Description
MOL Comfort	Bahamas	The 316-metre (1,037 ft) container ship carrying 4,500 containers from Singapore to Jeddah, Saudi Arabia, broke into two some 200 nautical miles (370 km; 230 mi) off the coast of Yemen. The crew of 26 were rescued from two life rafts and a lifeboat. The stern section sank on 27 June and bow section, after having been devastated by fire, on 11 July.

=== 19 June ===
List of shipwrecks: 19 June 2013
Ship	State	Description
Massimo M	Italy	The ro-ro ship had a fire in her engine room. She was consequently scrapped.

=== 20 June ===
List of shipwrecks: 20 June 2013
Ship	State	Description
Lisa von Lübeck; Sedov	Germany; Russia	The caravel Lisa von Lübeck collided with the full-rigged ship Sedov off Texel, North Holland, Netherlands. Both vessels were damaged and put into Den Helder, North Holland.
Tug No. 2	Malta	The tug was scuttled in the Mediterranean Sea off Sliema as an artificial reef.

=== 22 June ===
List of shipwrecks: 22 June 2013
Ship	State	Description
Nazo-S	Turkey	The chemical tanker caught fire 37 nautical miles (69 km; 43 mi) off Civitanova Marche. The crew of twelve was evacuated.

=== 23 June ===
List of shipwrecks: 23 June 2013
Ship	State	Description
Chang Xin Shun 888	China	Tropical Storm Bebinca: The cargo ship foundered in the Gulf of Tonkin off Hainan Island. Her crew were rescued.
Jin Ma 788	China	Tropical Storm Bebinca: The cargo ship foundered in the Gulf of Tonkin off Hainan Island. Her crew were rescued.
Tayyar Senkaya 1	Turkey	The cargo ship sank in the Mediterranean Sea off the coast of Antalya (35°59′N 30°24′E) likely due to improperly secured cargo. Her eleven crew were rescued by Gobustan (Malta). Tayyar Senkaya 1 was on a voyage from Karadeniz Ereğli to Singapore.

=== 24 June ===
List of shipwrecks: 24 June 2013
Ship	State	Description
Nisar R3	Cyprus	The vessel sank 1.4 nautical miles (2.6 km; 1.6 mi) off Port Sultan Qaboos, Oman, with a cargo of 816 tons of bitumen which spilled to the sea. Nine Indian crewmen were rescued while the Iranian captain was found dead.

=== 25 June ===
List of shipwrecks: 25 June 2013
Ship	State	Description
Algorail	Canada	The bulk carrier ran aground in the Saginaw River with a load of salt. The ship was freed after unloading some of its cargo into a barge.

=== 29 June ===
List of shipwrecks: 29 June 2013
Ship	State	Description
Minh Tuan 68	Vietnam	Tropical Storm Gorio: The cargo ship was driven ashore on Luzon Island, Philippines. She was refloated on 1 July.

== July ==
=== 1 July ===
List of shipwrecks: 1 July 2013
Ship	State	Description
Fu Sheng Hai	Panama	The cargo ship was driven ashore on Saeng Island, South Korea and broke in two. She was on a voyage from Lianyungang, China to Busan, South Korea. The bow section sank on 6 July.
Hammond Bay	United States Army	The tug sank in the St. Marys River at Sault Ste. Marie, Michigan.
Perro Negro 6	Bahamas	The jack up drilling rig, positioned between the coasts of Angola and the Democratic Republic of Congo, near the mouth of the Congo River, due to the collapsing of the seabed under one of the three legs, suddenly tilted and suffered hull damages. At 10.30 am CEST, the rig capsized and sank in approximately 40 metres of water.

=== 4 July ===
List of shipwrecks: 5 July 2013
Ship	State	Description
Hope	Bangladesh	The 97-metre (318 ft) cargo vessel was report to have sunk off Phuket, Thailand, and eleven crew members remain missing. It was later reported that ten of her 29 crew had been rescued by a Thai Navy helicopter. Five had been rescued by Buxmoon (Liberia) and five were missing. Hope had been taken under tow by a Malaysian tug.

=== 6 July ===
List of shipwrecks: 6 July 2013
Ship	State	Description
Fu Sheng Hai	China	The 1993-built 52,580 DWT bulk carrier ran aground and broke in two off Busan in the Japan Sea. The forward section sank to a depth of about 30 metres (98 ft).
Theodoros Maria Z	Belize	The passenger ship capsized and sank with the loss of one life.

=== 8 July ===
List of shipwrecks: 8 July 2013
Ship	State	Description
Albedo	Malaysia	Hijacked by Somali pirates on 26 November 2010, the 1993-built container ship sank in rough seas while anchored off the Somali Coast. Part of the superstructure remained above the surface. At least four crew members held as hostages and seven pirates are confirmed dead while 13 others, both hostages and pirates, remain missing.

=== 10 July ===
List of shipwrecks: 10 July 2013
Ship	State	Description
Harmony Rise	China	The cargo ship collided with Blessing (Greece) and sank in the Yellow Sea 6 nautical miles (11 km) off the coast of South Korea. Her twelve crew were rescued by Blessing.
Otilia	Panama	The tanker caught fire and was abandoned off Colón. She was on a voyage from Colón to Jamaica.

=== 11 July ===
List of shipwrecks: 11 July 2013
Ship	State	Description
Wyvern	Norway	The yacht foundered in the Baltic Sea off Öland, Sweden with the loss of one life. She was later raised, repaired and returned to service.

=== 12 July ===
List of shipwrecks: 12 July 2013
Ship	State	Description
MGM No.5	Cambodia	The cargo ship exploded and sank in the East China Sea off Namhae Island, South Korea. Her ten crew were rescued, nine by Fesco Diomid (Cyprus) and one by a South Korean Coast Guard helicopter.

=== 14 July ===
List of shipwrecks: 14 July 2013
Ship	State	Description
Samudera	Sierra Leone	The chemical tanker suffered an engine room fire in the Malacca Strait and was abandoned with the loss of one of her 23 crew. Survivors were rescued by Malaysia Maritime Enforcement Agency boats.

=== 15 July ===
List of shipwrecks: 15 July 2013
Ship	State	Description
Hansa Brandenburg	Liberia	Crew of seventeen was forced to abandon vessel some 200 nautical miles (370 km; 230 mi) northeast of Mauritius after one of the containers onboard caught fire. Her crew were rescued by Donau Trader (Liberia).

=== 16 July ===
List of shipwrecks: 16 July 2013
Ship	State	Description
Unnamed vessel	Unknown	A ship carrying asylum-seekers overturned 70 nautical miles (130 km) from Christmas Island.

=== 20 July ===
List of shipwrecks: 20 July 2013
Ship	State	Description
Sea Dayang 2	Philippines	The passenger ferry foundered off Sulu. All nineteen people on board were rescued by the Philippine Coast Guard and Philippine Navy.

=== 23 July ===
List of shipwrecks: 23 July 2013
Ship	State	Description
Unnamed vessel	flag unknown	A ship carrying asylum-seekers from Iraq, Iran, Sri Lanka and Syria sank near the West Java town of Cidaun, Indonesia with the loss of at least four people. An unknown number are missing.

=== 24 July ===
List of shipwrecks: 24 July 2013
Ship	State	Description
Astrid	Netherlands	Astrid. The brig ran aground on rocks off Kinsale, County Cork, Ireland. All 30 crew were rescued before she sank. Astrid was raised on 10 September. She was deemed a constructive total loss and was scrapped.

=== 31 July ===
List of shipwrecks: 31 July 2013
Ship	State	Description
Patriot Andalan	Indonesia	The tanker collided with the quayside and sank at Ternate.

== August ==
=== 1 August ===
List of shipwrecks: 1 August 2013
Ship	State	Description
Gladys	Indonesia	The container ship ran aground off Cheduba Island, Burma. and was abandoned by all but three of her crew. She was later refloated and reported arriving at Chittagong for scrapping in October 2014 as Lady.

=== 7 August ===
List of shipwrecks: 7 August 2013
Ship	State	Description
Hai Hong Da	China	The bulk carrier collided with Frontier Voyager (Panama and sank in the Yangtze Estuary. Fifteen of her eighteen crew were rescued, three were reported missing.

=== 8 August ===
List of shipwrecks: 8 August 2013
Ship	State	Description
Falado von Rhodos	Germany	The 20.35-metre (66 ft 9 in) brigantine foundered in the Atlantic Ocean off Reykjanes, Iceland (64°04′N 23°59′W). All twelve people on board were rescued by the Icelandic Coast Guard.
Kiani Satu	Antigua and Barbuda	The 16,717 DWT bulk carrier with a load of 330 tonnes of heavy fuel and 15,000 tonnes of rice ran aground in the Goukamma Estuary, on the South African Indian Ocean coast. The 1997-built ship developed mechanical problems in the heavy seas and drifted out of control until she stranded between two ecological-sensitive estuaries. All 19 crew members were evacuated by NSRI Knysna and NSRI Wilderness (both South Africa). On 19 August, it was reported that the 157-metre (515 ft) ship, then 70 nautical miles (130 km; 81 mi) from the shore, was taking on water. The salvage tugs attempted to tow the vessel as far into deep water as possible before she finally sank on 21 August.

=== 9 August ===
List of shipwrecks: 9 August 2013
Ship	State	Description
Blue Sirius	Estonia	The schooner ran aground off Aegna and was abandoned by the eleven people on board. She subsequently floated off half-submerged and with a severe list.
Varua Vaikava	Chile	The cargo ship departed from Valparaíso for Easter Island. She was subsequently abandoned in the Pacific Ocean (27°35′S 105°37′W).

=== 12 August ===
List of shipwrecks: 12 August 2013
Ship	State	Description
Ramco Crusader	Bahamas	The support vessel sank in the Atlantic Ocean 24 nautical miles (44 km) off Beberibe, Brazil following a fire in the engine room. Her fifteen crew were evacuated before the ship sank.
Yuan Heng	Panama	The cargo ship was driven ashore at Pamarawan, Philippines.

=== 13 August ===
List of shipwrecks: 13 August 2013
Ship	State	Description
Trans Summer	Hong Kong	Typhoon Utor: The cargo ship foundered 45 nautical miles (83 km) south west of Hong Kong. Her 21 crew were rescued by search-and-rescue helicopters.

=== 14 August ===
List of shipwrecks: 14 August 2013
Ship	State	Description
INS Sindhurakshak	Indian Navy	The Kilo-class submarine suffered an onboard explosion and sank at Bombay.

=== 16 August ===
List of shipwrecks: 16 August 2013
Ship	State	Description
St. Thomas Aquinas	Philippines	The 1973-built ferry collided with Sulpicio Express Siete (Philippines) at Cebu and sank with the loss of at least 116 lives. The ship was carrying 752 passengers and 118 crew at the time of the sinking.

=== 18 August ===
List of shipwrecks: 18 August 2013
Ship	State	Description
Estancia	Togo	The livestock carrier caught fire off Berbera, Somaliland and was abandoned by her crew.

=== 19 August ===
List of shipwrecks: 19 August 2013
Ship	State	Description
Smart	Panama	The 151,000 DWT bulk carrier ran aground in the east coast of South Africa after departing the Port of Richards Bay with a full cargo of coal. The crew of 23 were rescued, but the 1996-built, 273-metre (896 ft) vessel suffered a structural failure amidships and broke into three. The bow section was refloated and scuttled in December 2014. The midsection was buried on site in September 2015 and the stern section was refloated and scuttled in October 2013.

=== 22 August ===
List of shipwrecks: 22 August 2013
Ship	State	Description
An Shun Da 8	China	Tropical Storm Trami: The cargo ship foundered off Fujian Province. Six crew were reported missing. She was on a voyage from Zhangzhou to Xia Bai Shi.

=== 28 August ===
List of shipwrecks: 28 August 2013
Ship	State	Description
Scuderia	France	The trawler ran aground at Lankidden Cove, on the east side of The Lizard Cornwall, United Kingdom. None of the five crew were injured. She was refloated on 3 September and towed to Falmouth for repairs.

== September ==
=== 3 September ===
List of shipwrecks: 3 September 2013
Ship	State	Description
Fromveur II	France	The passenger ferry ran aground on Molène, Finistère. All 365 passengers were rescued by Société Nationale de Sauvetage en Mer lifeboats and by helicopter. Fromveur II was later refloated.

=== 6 September ===
List of shipwrecks: 6 September 2013
Ship	State	Description
Gold Star	Tanzania	The cargo ship was set afire by her crew 30 nautical miles (56 km) north of Malta in an effort to disguise drug running. She was under surveillance by the Italian Coast Guard. Her nine crew were rescued and arrested.

=== 7 September ===
List of shipwrecks: 7 September 2013
Ship	State	Description
Vale Indonesia	Marshall Islands	The bulk carrier ran aground and was damaged 40 nautical miles (74 km) north of São Luís, Maranhão, Brazil. She was on a voyage from Ponta de Madeira, Brazil to Subic Bay, Philippines.

=== 8 September ===
List of shipwrecks: 8 September 2013
Ship	State	Description
Luna-S	Tanzania	The cargo ship was set afire by her crew and abandoned inn the Mediterranean Sea in an attempt to disguise drug running during and interception by the French Navy. Her crew were rescued and arrested. Luna-S was taken in tow by the salvage tug Abeille Flandres (France).

=== 9 September ===
List of shipwrecks: 9 September 2013
Ship	State	Description
Fortune Cloud	Panama	The cargo ship collided with Abdullah (Bangladesh) at Chittagong and sank in shallow water. Abdullah was severely damaged.

=== 10 September ===
List of shipwrecks: 10 September 2013
Ship	State	Description
Amurskiy Leman	Russia	The refrigerated cargo ship ran aground and was damaged in the Tatarskiy Strait. She was subsequently towed into De-Kastri.

=== 12 September ===
List of shipwrecks: 12 September 2013
Ship	State	Description
Pasha	Tanzania	The cargo ship ran aground in the Marmara Sea off Narli Köyü, Turkey after her cargo shifted. Her nine crew were rescued. She was driven ashore and wrecked on 2 February 2015.

=== 17 September ===
List of shipwrecks: 17 September 2013
Ship	State	Description
Angra Star	Brazil	The cargo ship partially sank in the Bay of Guanabara off Rio de Janeiro, Brazil, following the theft of copper from her engine room.

=== 20 September ===
List of shipwrecks: 20 September 2013
Ship	State	Description
Chaos	United States	After her anchor line parted in a gale, the 41-gross ton, 49-foot (14.9 m) or 54-foot (16.5 m) longline fishing vessel was wrecked on the west side of Unalaska Bay on the coast of Unalaska Island in the Aleutian Islands. A United States Coast Guard Sikorsky MH-60 Jayhawk helicopter rescued her entire crew of four on 21 September, but she became a total loss.

=== 23 September ===
List of shipwrecks: 23 September 2013
Ship	State	Description
Jung Soon	Malaysia	The cargo ship foundered off Borneo with the loss of one of her twelve crew.

=== 27 September ===
List of shipwrecks: 27 September 2013
Ship	State	Description
Eifuku Maru No.18	Japan	The cargo ship collided with Jia Hui (Sierra Leone) 6 nautical miles (11 km) west of Izu, Shizuoka and capsized with the loss of six of her crew.

=== 29 September ===
List of shipwrecks: 29 September 2013
Ship	State	Description
Three unidentified fishing vessels	China	Typhoon Wutip: The fishing vessels sank in the South China Sea due to the effects of a typhoon, leaving 74 people missing.

== October ==
=== 1 October ===
List of shipwrecks: 1 October 2013
Ship	State	Description
Anafarta	Turkey	The cargo ship sprang a leak and was beached at Riva, Beykoz, Turkey.

=== 3 October ===
List of shipwrecks: 3 October 2013
Ship	State	Description
Unidentified vessel	Libya	With approximately 500 migrants on board, the vessel sank in the Mediterranean Sea off the coast of Lampedusa, killing at least 300 people.

=== 4 October ===
List of shipwrecks: October 2013
Ship	State	Description
Bright Royal	Panama	The bulk carrier ran aground off Ly Son, Vietnam and was damaged. She was on a voyage from Taiwan to Vung Ang, Vietnam.

=== 7 October ===
List of shipwrecks: 7 October 2013
Ship	State	Description
Maria	Netherlands	The offshore supply vessel collided with the fishing vessel Vertrouwen (Netherlands) and sank in the North Sea off Den Helder, North Holland with the loss of three of her five crew.

=== 11 October ===
List of shipwrecks: 11 October 2013
Ship	State	Description
Unnamed ship	Unknown	A ship carrying migrants capsized in international waters near the island of Lampedusa with the loss of 27 people. At least 221 people were saved by a Maltese search and rescue operation.

=== 12 October ===
List of shipwrecks: 12 October 2013
Ship	State	Description
Bingo	Panama	Cyclone Phailin: The cargo ship foundered in the Bay of Bengal 40 nautical miles (74 km) south of Haldia, India. Her eighteen crew were rescued.
Spirit of Fiji Islands	Fiji	The ferry caught fire in the Luzon Strait north of Babuyan Island, Philippines and was abandoned by her crew.

=== 13 October ===
List of shipwrecks: 13 October 2013
Ship	State	Description
No. 233	Korean People's Navy	The Hainan-class submarine chaser sank off Wonsan with the loss of at least 20 of her crew. The ship collided with a Korean People's Navy patrol boat, which also sank.

=== 14 October ===
List of shipwrecks: 14 October 2013
Ship	State	Description
Super Sun	Panama	The cargo ship was severely damaged by fire off the mouth of the Yangtze River. Her 23 crew were rescued.

=== 15 October ===
List of shipwrecks: 15 October 2013
Ship	State	Description
Cheng Lu 15	Panama	The cargo ship foundered at Pohang, South Korea with the loss of nine of her nineteen crew.
Yong Win 3	Honduras	The tanker capsized and sank off Little Liouchiou, Taiwan. Her crew were rescued.

=== 17 October ===
List of shipwrecks: 17 October 2013
Ship	State	Description
Livadia	Slovakia	Typhoon Wipha: The cargo ship was driven ashore on Iturup, Kuril Islands.
Varandey	Russia	Typhoon Wipha: The cargo ship was beached off Paramushir, Kuril Islands.

=== 19 October ===
List of shipwrecks: 19 October 2013
Ship	State	Description
Hai Phong 02	Vietnam	The cargo ship caught fire in the Gulf of Tonkin (18°13′N 106°30′E). Her eleven crew were rescued by SAR 274 ( Vietnam Coast Guard). Hai Phong 02 was later towed into Vung Ang.

=== 20 October ===
List of shipwrecks: 20 October 2013
Ship	State	Description
Wealthy Globe	Vanuatu	The crane ship caught fire at Vung Tau, Vietnam and was abandoned by her 31 crew.

=== 28 October ===
List of shipwrecks: 28 October 2013
Ship	State	Description
Coral Ivory; Siderfly	Netherlands; Saint Vincent and the Grenadines	The gas carrier Coral Ivory collided with Siderfly in the Kiel Canal. Both vessels were beached.
Stena Alegra	United Kingdom	St Jude storm: The RO-RO ferry was driven ashore at Karlskrona, Sweden.

=== 30 October ===
List of shipwrecks: 30 October 2013
Ship	State	Description
Fernanda	Dominica	The cargo ship caught fire off Vestmannaeyjar, Iceland. Her crew were rescued by ICGV Þór (Icelandic Coast Guard), which towed Fernanda in to Hafnarfjörður.

== November ==
=== 1 November ===
List of shipwrecks: 1 November 2013
Ship	State	Description
Arctic Hunter	United States	After her captain fell asleep at her helm, the 93.2-foot (28.4 m) fishing vessel ran onto rocks and was wrecked near Summer Bay (53.9123°N 166.4559°W) north of Morris Cove (53°55′00″N 166°26′10″W) on the coast of Unalaska Island in the Aleutian Islands. Wearing survival suits, her crew abandoned ship in a life raft and was rescued by the fishing vessel Saga (United States). Arctic Hunter's wreck later was scrapped.

=== 2 November ===
List of shipwrecks: 2 November 2013
Ship	State	Description
Stella	Sierra Leone	The coaster foundered in the Aegean Sea off Karpathos, Greece with the loss of one of her six crew.

=== 3 November ===
List of shipwrecks: 3 November 2013
Ship	State	Description
Panamera	France	The fishing vessel sank off Lizard Point, Cornwall, United Kingdom. There was no loss of life.

=== 5 November ===
List of shipwrecks: 5 November 2013
Ship	State	Description
Gudri	Panama	The offshore tug capsized and sank in the Bonny River.
Hang Sheng 18	China	The cargo ship was in collision with OOCL Southampton (Hong Kong) off Hong Kong and sank. Her twelve crew were rescued.

=== 6 November ===
List of shipwrecks: 6 November 2013
Ship	State	Description
Caraka Jaya Niaga III	Indonesia	The cargo ship foundered off Meneng, East Java. The wreck was removed in January 2015.

=== 8 November ===
List of shipwrecks: 8 November 2013
Ship	State	Description
Eva Jocelyn	Philippines	Typhoon Haiyan: The coaster was driven ashore at Tacloban.
Hueng-A Dragon	South Korea	The cargo ship was in collision with Eleni (Marshall Islands) off Vung Tao, Vietnam and sank. Her nineteen crew were rescued.
Shu Hang 998	China	Typhoon Haiyan: Three crew members drowned while four others were reported missing after their cargo vessel sank at Sanya.

=== 9 November ===
List of shipwrecks: 9 November 2013
Ship	State	Description
Andrea Princess	Philippines	Typhoon Haiyan: The cargo ship was driven ashore and wrecked on Ando Island with the loss of two of her 22 crew. Five were reported missing, fifteen were rescued by the Philippine Coast Guard.
Cagayan Bay 1	Philippines	Typhoon Haiyan: The ro-ro ferry was driven ashore at Mandaue.
Metro Tug II	Philippines	Typhoon Haiyan: The tug capsized and sank at Consolacion, Cebu. She was later salvaged.
Ozamis Bay 1	Philippines	Typhoon Haiyan: The ferry was driven ashore at Mandue.
Super Shuttle Ferry 17	Philippines	Typhoon Haiyan: The ferry sank at Cebu.

=== 10 November ===
List of shipwrecks: 10 November 2013
Ship	State	Description
Tomi Elegance	Philippines	Typhoon Haiyan: The coaster was driven ashore at Tacloban.

=== 11 November ===
List of shipwrecks: 11 November 2013
Ship	State	Description
Nordstjernen	Norway	The former Hurtigruten coaster with 21 people on board ran aground in the Karmsund strait, Norway.

=== 22 November ===
List of shipwrecks: 22 November 2013
Ship	State	Description
Little Junior	Philippines	The tug foundered off Merida, Leyte. Her crew were rescued.

=== 24 November ===
List of shipwrecks: 24 November 2013
Ship	State	Description
Abundance	United States	The 43-gross ton, 44.1-foot (13.4 m) passenger and fishing vessel was destroyed by fire while adrift in Behm Canal in Southeast Alaska. Of the two men who had been aboard her, one was found ashore; the other disappeared after parting company with him to return to Abundance and was never seen again.
Bum Jin 5	South Korea	The tanker was driven ashore at Ulsan. Her crew were rescued.
CS Crane	Panama	The tanker was driven ashore at Ulsan. Her eleven crew were rescued.
Zhou Hang 2	China	The cargo ship was driven ashore at Ulsan. Her crew were rescued.

=== 25 November ===
List of shipwrecks: 25 November 2013
Ship	State	Description
Stephen L. Colby	United States	The towboat struck a submerged object and sank in the Mississippi River. Her nine crew survived.
Xing Long Zhou 65	China	The cargo ship foundered off Shandong.
Zihai Shun	China	The cargo ship foundered off Shandong.

=== 27 November ===
List of shipwrecks: 27 November 2013
Ship	State	Description
Theresa Bitung	Tuvalu	The cargo ship caught fire off the Spratly Islands and was abandoned by her 26 crew, who were rescued by Maiden Voyage (Marshall Islands).

=== 30 November ===
List of shipwrecks: 30 November 2013
Ship	State	Description
Ocean Countess	Portugal	The passenger ship caught fire at Chalkis, Greece. Her skeleton crew of five survived. Ocean Countess was consequently scrapped.

== December ==
=== 6 December ===
List of shipwrecks: 6 December 2013
Ship	State	Description
Innvik	Norway	The restaurant ship foundered in a storm while at anchor at Svestad, Norway. The ship's aft section was submerged, while the bow remained above water. In April 2014, Innvik, which had been found to be damaged beyond economic repair, was sent to Fredrikshavn in Denmark for scrapping. The breaking of the vessel commenced in July 2014.

=== 11 December ===
List of shipwrecks: 11 December 2013
Ship	State	Description
Nour M	Sierra Leone	The cargo ship capsized and sank at Rhodes, Greece.

=== 14 December ===
List of shipwrecks: 14 December 2013
Ship	State	Description
Asia Peace	Panama	The cargo ship foundered in the Luzon Strait, 20 crew were rescued by Yangtze Eternal (Hong Kong).

=== 17 December ===
List of shipwrecks: 17 December 2013
Ship	State	Description
Golden Miller	Saint Kitts and Nevis	The LPG tanker was severely damaged by fire at Aratu, Brazil. Her crew were evacuated.

=== 20 December ===
List of shipwrecks: 20 December 2013
Ship	State	Description
Francis Gerena	Solomon Islands	The ferry sank 8 nautical miles (15 km) north of Anuha Island. Over 390 people were rescued from the boat, which was licensed to carry 80 people.

=== 23 December ===
List of shipwrecks: 23 December 2013
Ship	State	Description
TCG Degirmendere	Turkish Navy	The tug capsized and sank at İzmir with the loss of ten lives.

=== 24 December ===
List of shipwrecks: 24 December 2013
Ship	State	Description
Silver	Morocco	The tanker ran aground at Tan-Tan, Morocco.

=== 25 December ===
List of shipwrecks: 25 December 2013
Ship	State	Description
Orsula	Marshall Islands	The bulk carrier ran aground in Lake Ontario off the Tibbetts Point Lighthouse, New York, United States. She was refloated on 30 December.

=== 27 December ===
List of shipwrecks: 27 December 2013
Ship	State	Description
Xing Tai 5	China	The container ship capsized and sank off Shanghai with the loss of five of her sixteen crew.

=== 29 December ===
List of shipwrecks: 29 December 2013
Ship	State	Description
Maritime Maisie	Hong Kong	The chemical tanker collided with Gravity Highway (Bahamas) off Busan, South Korea and caught fire. All 91 people on board the two vessels were evacuated. Maritime Maisie subsequently drifted into Japanese waters before six tugs reached her. She was finally allowed to dock in Ulsan, Korea on 28 April 2014 for assessment as to whether or not she was salvageable.
MSC Monterey	Liberia	The container ship sustained a crack in her hull off the coast of Newfoundland, Canada. Four passengers were taken off by helicopter while her 20 crew members remained on board. Temporary repairs were performed in Newfoundland.
Sae Byol	Cambodia	The cargo ship ran aground off Haimao Island, China and was abandoned by her fifteen crew.

=== Unknown date ===
List of shipwrecks: Unknown date 2013
Ship	State	Description
Aspro	Cambodia	The cargo ship ran aground in the Azov Sea off Eysk, Russia. She was still aground five days later.

== Unknown date ==
List of shipwrecks: Unknown date 2013
Ship	State	Description
Hantallar	Turkey	The cargo ship ran aground off Tekirdağ. She was declared a total loss.
