= Babbacombe Bay =

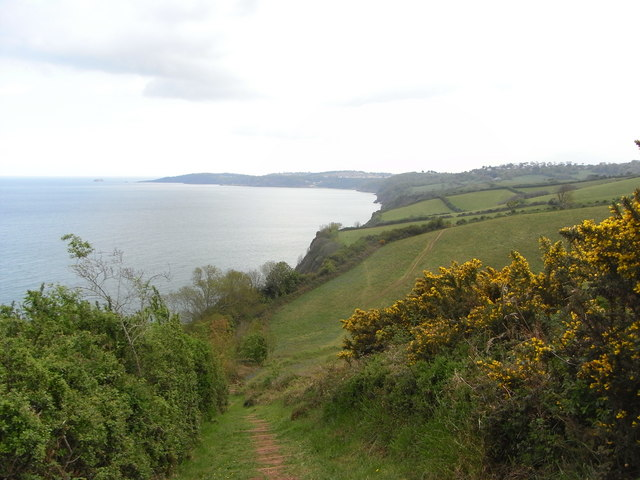
- South West Coast Path above Babbacombe Bay

- Location in Devon
- Location: South-East Devon, England, UK
- Coordinates: 50°31′N 3°25′W
- Type: Bay
- Part of: Lyme Bay
- Surface area: 7.2 km (4.5 mi)

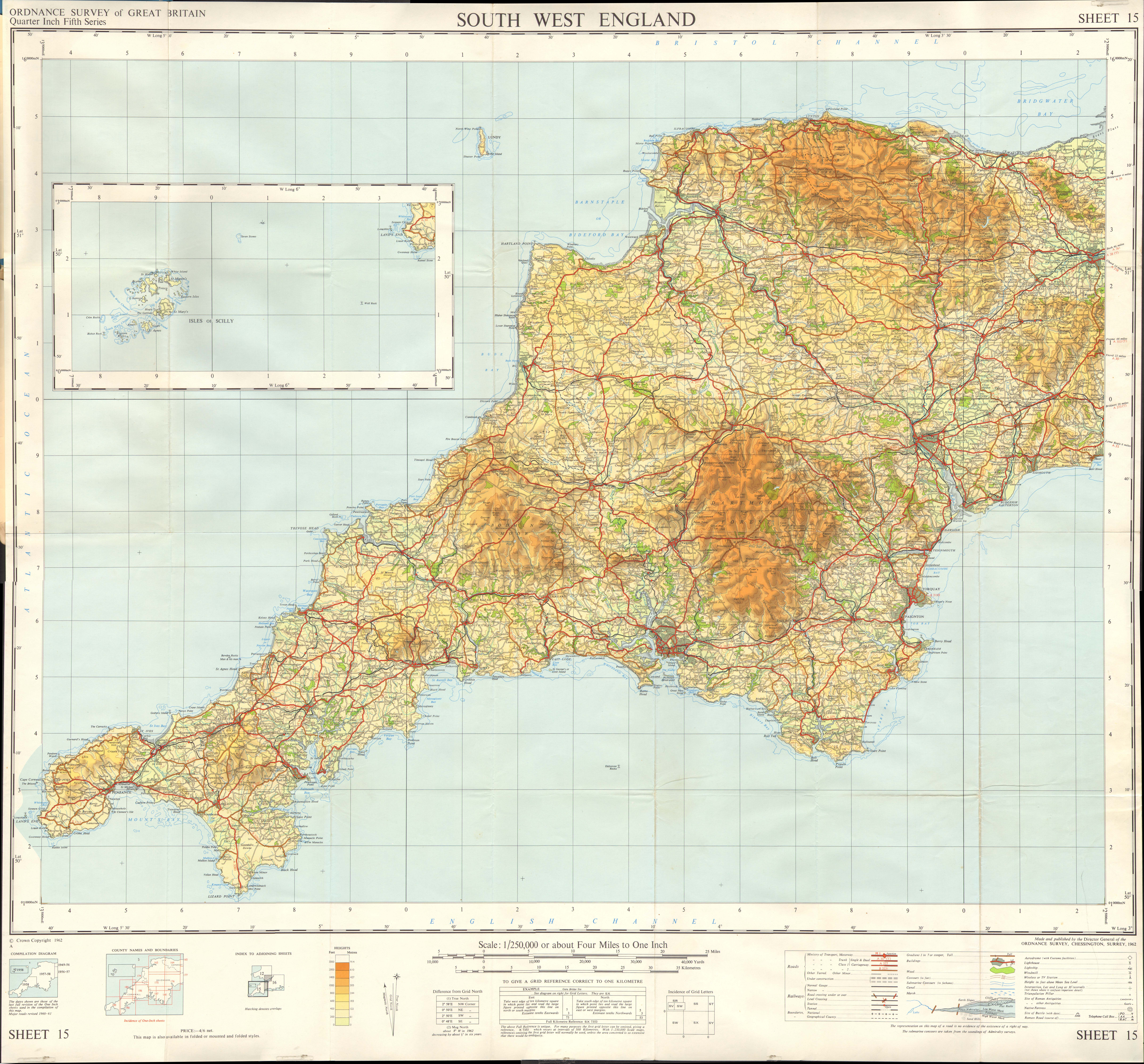
Map of the three east-facing bays of the Lyme Bay sheltered part of the English Channel

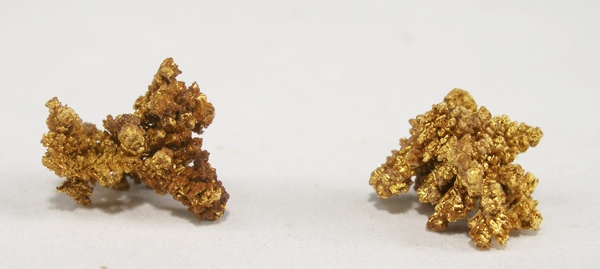
Two crystalline gold specimens from Hope's Nose. Largest is 0.9 x 0.8 x 0.7 cm.

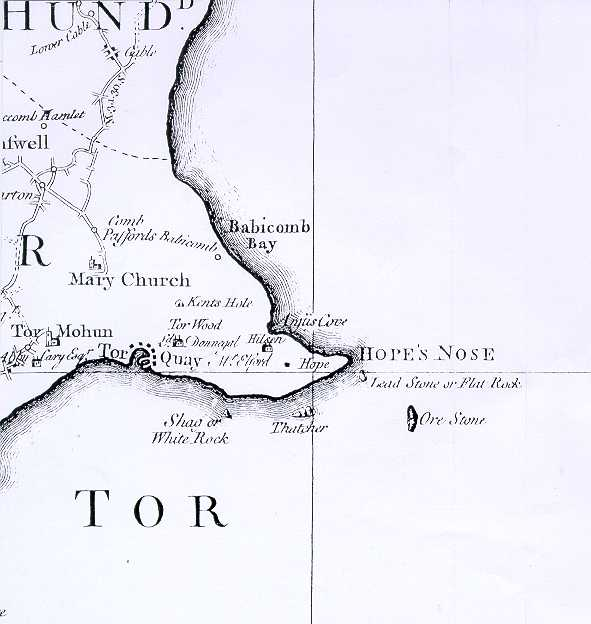
Map, of 1795, of the south of the bay and beyond.

Babbacombe Bay is a South-East Devon shallow, wide, continuation of the main sweep of Lyme Bay which, in turn, to the east is the western end of the Jurassic Coast (mainly in Dorset) in England, UK. It faces east towards the parent, notably large bay of the English Channel, weakly sheltered from large tides from the east but much so from Atlantic tides, currents and storms from the west. As a sub-bay it covers about 7.2 km (4.5 mi). It is bounded by:

- Hope's Nose the east end of the steep and jagged northern edge of Torquay, as the bay's southern tip;
- with no prominence bar a short, east-reaching, harbour wall at Teignmouth to the immediate north, the River Teign.

Some of the much removed crystalline deposits of gold at the southern point are in a longstanding exhibit of the Natural History Museum, London. These are notable to mineral collectors. Dawlish along the bay is a town which saw its seaside mainline railway rebuilt quickly due to the unusually fierce 2013–14 United Kingdom winter floods.

Sand in several places, and cliffs are often red and derived from Permian New Red Sandstone, interspersed with outcrops of Devonian limestone.
