= Charles Williams (Royal Navy officer) =

Rear-Admiral Charles Williams CB OBE
- Born: Charles Bernard Williams'; 19 February 1925; Grahamstown, Cape Province, Union of South Africa
- Died: 11 June 2015 (aged 90)
- Allegiance: United Kingdom
- Branch: Royal Navy
- Rank: Rear-Admiral
- Conflicts: World War II
- Awards: Companion of the Order of the Bath; Officer of the Order of the British Empire

Rear-Admiral Charles Bernard Williams CB OBE (19 February 1925 – 11 June 2015) was an officer of the Royal Navy. He was chairman of the Whitbread Round the World Race from 1981 to 1990.

Williams was born in Grahamstown, Union of South Africa, in 1925. He joined the Royal Navy soon after the start of the Second World War and became an engineering officer. He worked on ships of the Russian convoys and those providing gun fire support during the Normandy landings.

He was appointed an Officer of the Order of the British Empire (OBE) in the 1967 Birthday Honours for his work at the shore base HMS Sheba repairing British ships involved in the blockade of Beira. He was made a Companion of the Order of the Bath (CB) on his retirement in the 1980 Birthday Honours by which time he was Flag Officer, Medway and Port Admiral at Chatham Naval Base.

Williams was involved with the restoration of the Dutch lugger STV Astrid with the financial support of Sir Jack Hayward.
