= STV Astrid =

Tall ship

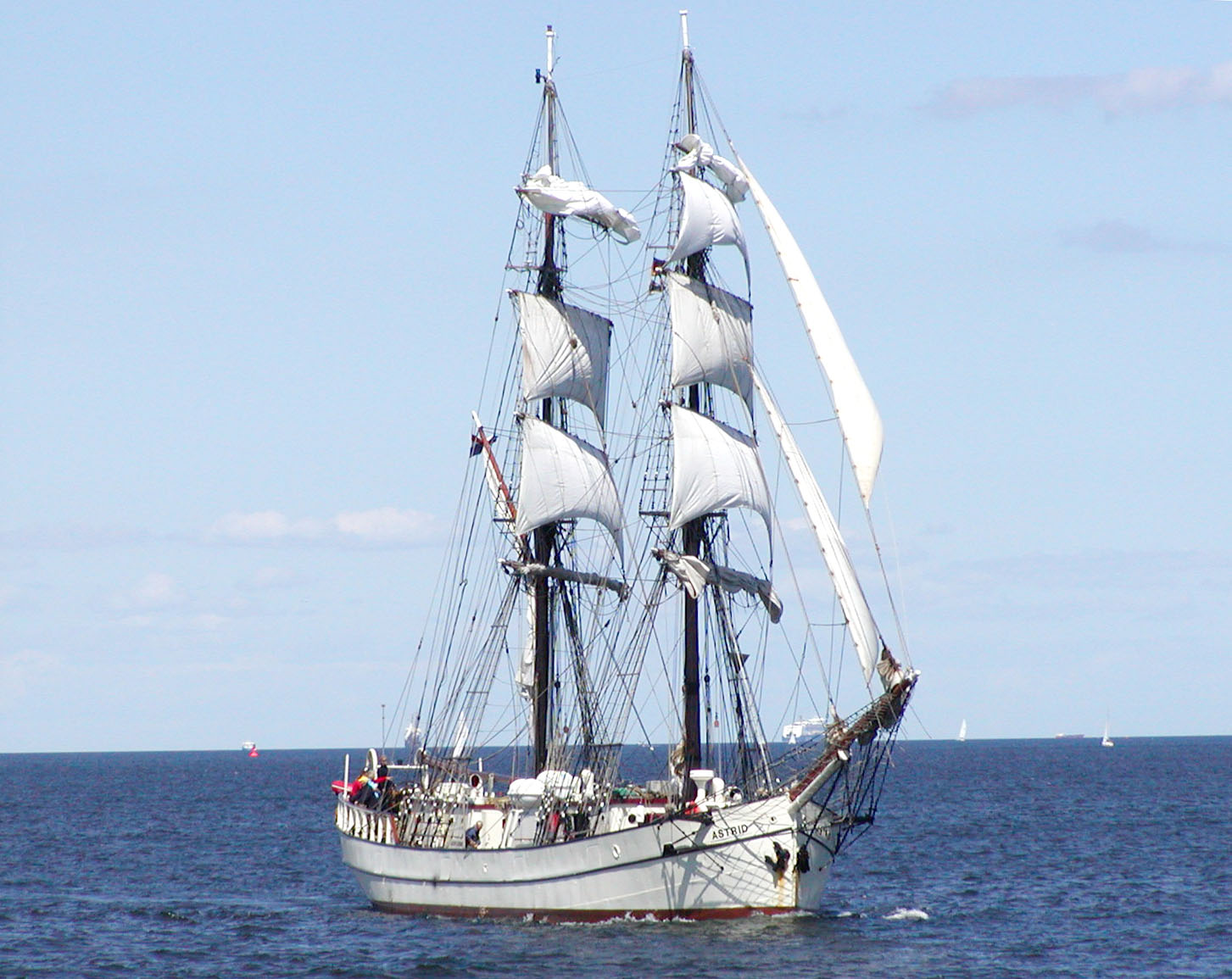
- Astrid in 2008

History
- Name: W.U.T.A. (1924–37); Astrid (since 1937)
- Owner: N. Müller (1930–37); J. Jeppson (1937– ); Astrid Trust (1989–96); Ineke and Pieter de Kam (2006–13)
- Port of registry: Dordrecht, Netherlands (1924–37); Skillinge, Sweden (1937–75); Lebanon (1975–84); Weymouth, United Kingdom (1984–97); Vlissingen, Netherlands (1997–2013)
- Builder: G van Leeuwen, Scheveningen
- Launched: 1918
- In service: 1924
- Out of service: 2013
- Identification: Code letters QOSF (1924–34); Code Letters PIRV (1934–37); Code Letters SLEK (1937–75); Code Letters PCDS (? – 2013) *; IMO number: 5027792
- Fate: Scrapped

General characteristics
- Tonnage: 182 GRT, 143 NRT (as built); 140 GT; 215 DWT
- Length: 41.90 m (137 ft 6 in)
- Beam: 6.48 metres (21 ft 3 in)
- Draught: 2.65 metres (8 ft 8 in)
- Depth: 2.87 metres (9 ft 5 in)
- Propulsion: Sail and motor
- Sail plan: Lugger (as built); Schooner (c.1930–37); Brig (1989–2013)

STV Astrid was a 41.90-metre (137 ft 6 in) long tall ship that was built in 1918 in the Netherlands as a lugger and originally named W.U.T.A., short for Wacht Uw Tijd Af meaning "Bide Your Time". She was later transferred to Swedish ownership, renamed Astrid and sailed on the Baltic Sea until 1975. She then sailed under a Lebanese flag and was allegedly used for drug smuggling. After being found burnt out on the coast of England in the early 1980s, she was overhauled and used as a sailing training vessel. She was based in Weymouth, Dorset, United Kingdom and was informally known as "Weymouth's vessel".

Astrid ran aground off the coast of Ireland on 24 July 2013, and subsequently sank, with all on board rescued. She was salvaged on 9 September 2013, but as the cost of restoring her was too high she was scrapped and broken up by April 2014.

== Structure ==
Astrid was a dual-masted, square-rigged, iron/steel-hulled tall ship. She was 42-metre (138 ft) in length, with a 7-metre (23 ft) beam, a 2.7-metre (8.9 ft) draught and a mast height of 25 metres (82 ft). In addition to her sails, she also had a small 253-kilowatt (339 hp) Scania Ds 1402 four-stroke diesel motor for propulsion. Astrid was the smallest tall ship in the Dutch fleet.

As built, Astrid had a gross register tonnage of 182; she was 143 net register tonnage with a capacity of 123 tons under her deck. Her dimensions were 30.8 metres (100.9 ft) length, 6.5 metres (21.3 ft) beam and 2.9 metres (9.5 ft) depth. Her four-stroke single cycle, single action 2-cylinder auxiliary diesel engine was built by Gasmotorenfabrikant Deutz A.G., Köln, Germany. The cylinders were 279 by 451 millimetres (11 in × 17.75 in) bore by stroke.

Astrid had two deckhouses: one at the stern with navigational equipment and maps, and another forward containing a bar. The lower deck had twelve 2-person cabins (of which three could be used as 3-person cabins) as well as showers, toilets and a galley.

== Career ==
Astrid was built in 1918 in Scheveningen, Netherlands by G van Leeuwen as W.U.T.A., short for Wacht Uw Tijd Af meaning "Bide Your Time". She was originally rigged as a lugger. By 1930, she had been re-rigged as an auxiliary schooner. Then owned by N. Müller, her port of registry was Dordrecht, South Holland and her code letters were QOSF. In 1934, her Code Letters were changed to PIRV.

In 1937, Astrid (then known as W.U.T.A.) was sold to Swede J. Jeppson and renamed Astrid. Her port of registry was changed to Skillinge and the Code Letters SLEK were allocated. By this time, she had been derigged and was operating on her engine alone. Astrid was used on trade routes in the North Sea and Baltic Sea until 1975. Astrid then sailed under a Lebanese flag. She was allegedly used for drug smuggling, and was being shadowed in the English Channel by HM Customs and Excise when she mysteriously caught fire. Astrid was found abandoned and burnt to a shell off the coast of England in the early 1980s by Graham Neilson.

Astrid was transferred to British ownership in 1984 when she was overhauled for the Astrid Trust, a private company limited by guarantee. The restoration was financially supported by Sir Jack Hayward, and also involved Rear Admiral Charles Williams. She was subsequently dedicated on 17 May 1989 by Princess Anne, following which she took part in the 800th anniversary celebrations of the Lord Mayor of London. Astrid then competed in the 1989 Cutty Sark Tall Ships' Race. She also competed in the 1990 and 1991 Cutty Sark Tall Ships' Races. Astrid made more than 16 crossings of the Atlantic Ocean as a training ship.

Astrid was captained by Paul Compton until 1999. In December 1996, the Astrid Trust was wound up, and Astrid, then lying at Barbados, was put up for sale with an asking price of £750,000. Following her sale in 1997, Astrid was converted into a luxury sailing vessel in 1999–2000, after which she could carry 45 passengers, or have 24 guest crew members. Since circa 2006, she had been owned by Ineke and Pieter de Kam. Astrid was a regular participant, and winner of several prizes, in Tall Ship Races and Regattas. Astrid was based in Weymouth Harbour, and was informally known as "Weymouth's vessel".

== Sinking and salvage operation ==
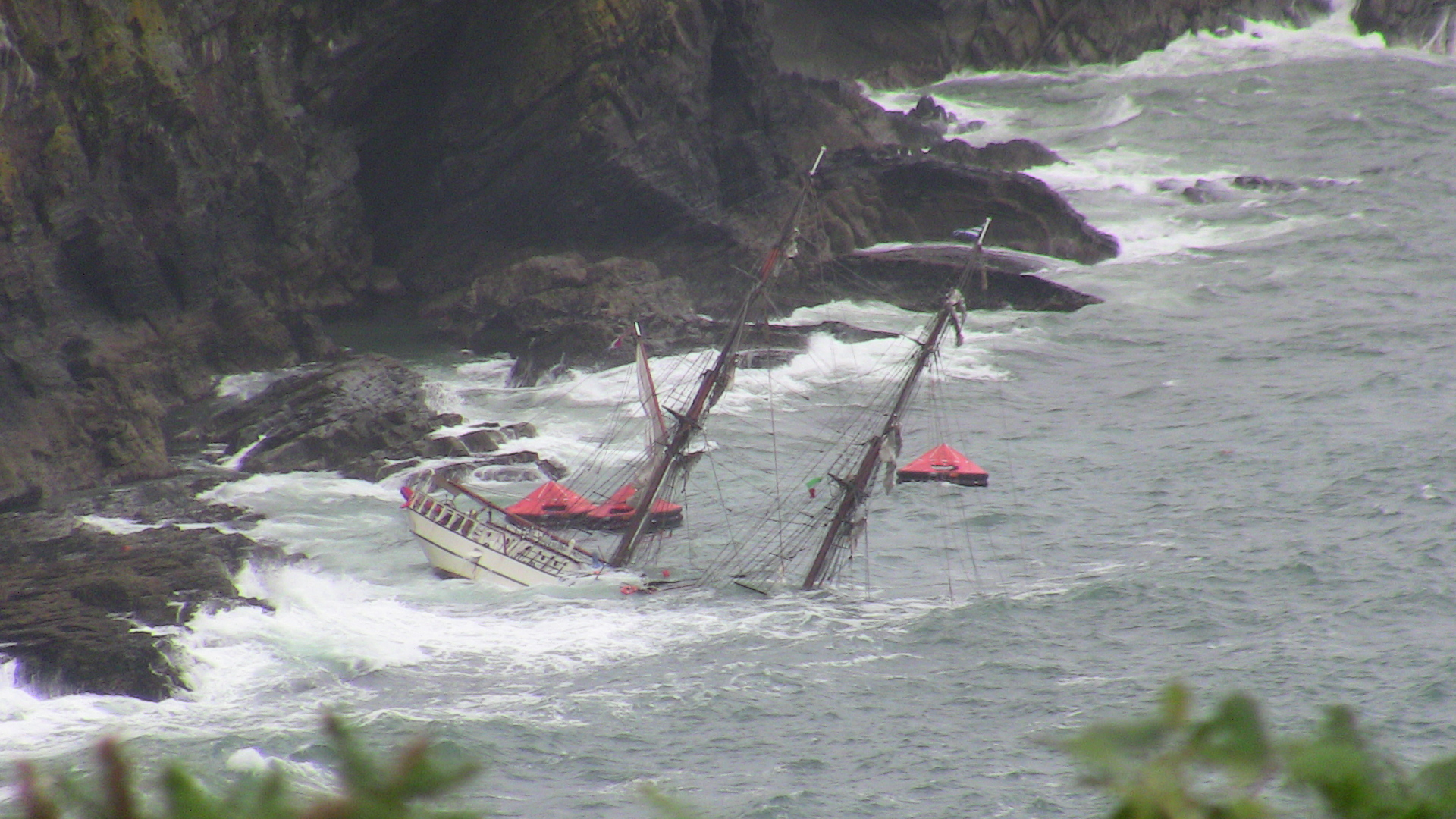
Astrid sinking on 24 July 2013

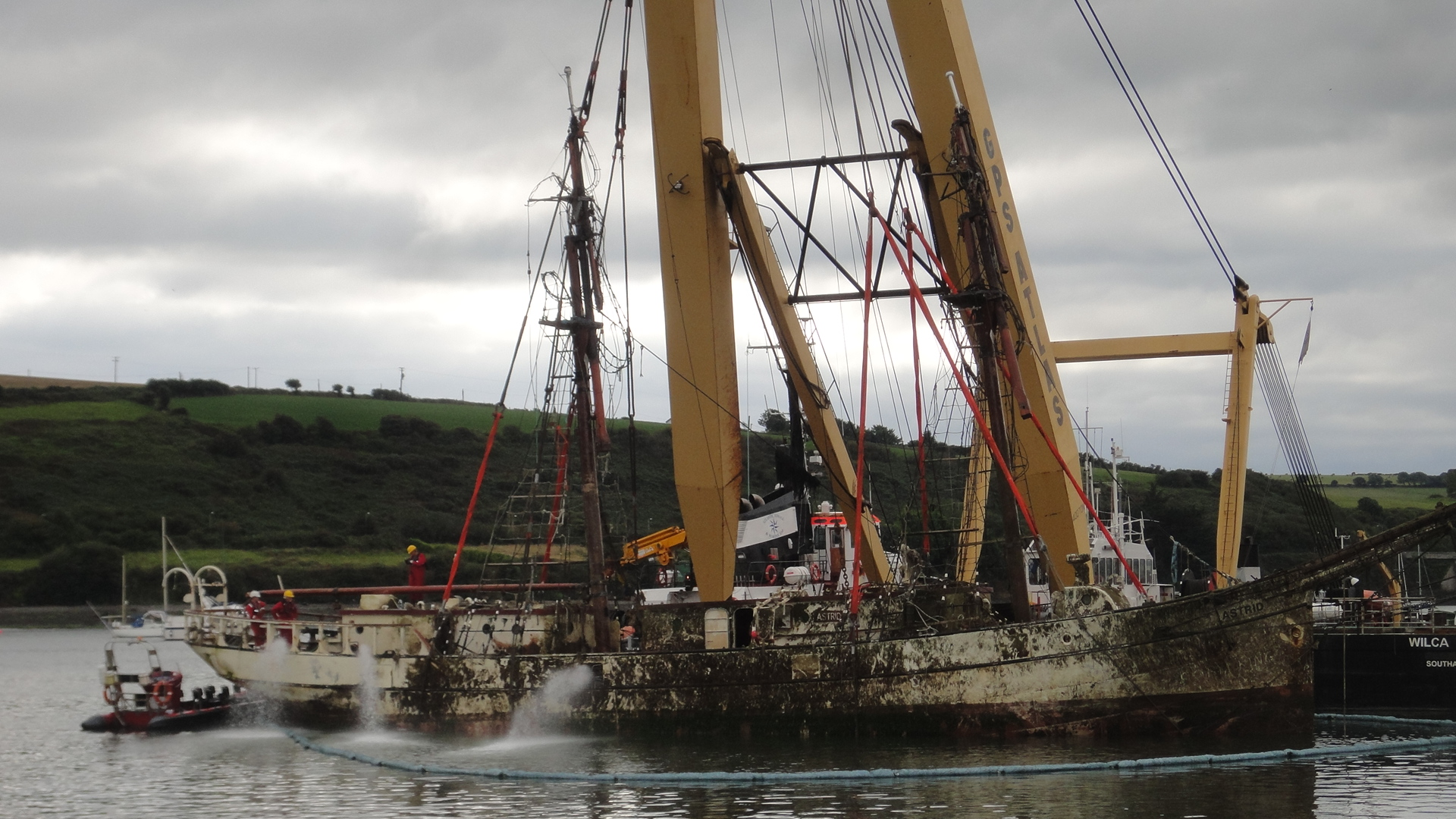
The wreck of Astrid after she had been raised.

Astrid departed from Southampton, UK on 14 July 2013 and was due to arrive in Cherbourg, Seine-Maritime, France on 28 July 2013 as part of a European Union International Exchange program.

As of 14:00 on 23 July 2013, the ship was anchored in Oysterhaven Anchorage in County Cork. The 30 crew members of the ship consisted of the master; three permanent crew members; a cook on a temporary contract; a mentor; and 24 trainees aged from 15-24 (eight from Ireland, four from the Netherlands, three from the United Kingdom, six from France, two from Belgium and one from Spain). This meant that there were 23 teenagers and 7 adults on board, consisting of 24 trainees and 6 permanent crew. Pieter de Kam was captaining the ship.

The Astrid raised its anchor at around 11:00 on 24 July 2013, and left Oysterhaven on motor power. She was one of 50 vessels participating in Ireland's 2013 Gathering Cruise between Oysterhaven and Kinsale. At around 11:35 her sails were being raised while the engine was still in use, and the ship was sailing towards the south-west at around 3 knots. At around 11:40, the ship's engine failed.

Around midday on 24 July 2013, Astrid ran aground on Quay Rock at Ballymacus Point, near the Sovereign Islands in southern Ireland, while attempting to enter the harbour near Kinsale, County Cork. The ship's engine failure prevented her from pulling herself off the rocks. The thirty crew members were rescued from the tall ship, with 18 being rescued by a RNLI lifeboat and the other 12 by another tall ship. Four RNLI lifeboats and two Irish Coast Guard helicopters were involved in the rescue. The incident was filmed by the Irish Coast Guard. None of the crew suffered any injuries.

The entire hull of the vessel was covered by water, with a 200-metre (660 ft) exclusion zone being enforced by the patrol ship LÉ Róisín. On 26 July, divers and a surveyor started assessing whether salvage and repair of the ship would be possible. Initial reports indicated that Astrid had been looted overnight from 26 to 27 July, with the ship's wheel and heavy brass compass and bell stolen from the ship. However, it soon emerged that some of the items were missing from the ship within hours of the incident; subsequent news reports stated that the wheel was likely ripped off the ship by the sea within 48 hours of the accident, and the Irish Coastguard and Naval Service issued a warning to stay away from the wreck. Salvage divers recovered all three missing items from the ship on 9 August, and they were handed over to the ship's owner. A video showing their recovery, and the damage to the ship, was later released.

Extensive damage was found by the divers' preliminary examination of the ship, including tearing and inch-sized gaps in Astrid's hull, as well as popped rivets and spread plates. The salvage company Blue Ocean, of Castletownbere, were appointed to recover the ship. The plans for the salvage operation consisted of removing around 3.5 tonnes of diesel fuel from the ship's fuel tanks, pumping water out of the ship and cutting away equipment including the rigging and masts, before a floating crane lifted the vessel from the rocks. The ship would then be taken to a nearby port to be handed over to the insurers. As of the end of July 2013 it was thought that the ship will never sail again, and that she would be written off as a total constructive loss. A month after sinking, Astrid was still under water.

Plans for the salvage operation were approved by the Irish Coast Guard, and the salvage operation began on 1 September, with work to remove loose ropes and secure the fuel containers; the salvage operation was expected to take up to 3 weeks. Astrid was recovered by the sheerleg GPS Atlas on 9 September 2013 by Atlantic Towage and Marine, and was transported on a barge to Kinsale for assessment and an investigation of what caused the accident. The insurers of the ship deemed the cost of restoring Astrid to be too high due to the damage caused while she was partially submerged (an economic write-off); as such she was scrapped and taken to Cork Harbour to be broken up. The scrapping process was completed by April 2014.

== Investigation ==
On 23 July 2014, a day before the anniversary of the Astrid's sinking, an interim announcement from the Marine Casualty Investigation Board (MCIB) said that the loss was due to engine failure, and that a full report would be posted once standard procedure to ensure "natural justice" had been followed. They rated the type of incident as a "Very Serious Marine Casualty". On the same day, it was reported that some of the canvas sails from the Astrid, as well as some of the timber from the lifeboats, had been turned into designer handbags.

The MCIB released their full report on 11 February 2015. The report found that the main cause of the incident was that the ship had not been operated safely in compliance with international conventions, and that the direct cause of the ship's grounding was due to engine failure as a result of fresh water contamination of the engine's fuel, which occurred by human error when the water was taken on board in Brighton on 12 July 2013. It found a "catalogue of failures and breaches of international regulations", including unsafe route planning that was influenced by photo opportunities rather than following the safest route, and it recommended that the master of the ship should always have authority to override courses during promotional activities to ensure the safety of the ship and its crew and passengers. It found that the SOLAS Conventions had been breached, and that the ship had not been certified as a passenger ship for either EU or international voyages, that the crew were not appropriately certified, and that the ship should not have been at sea. The liferafts were three months overdue of inspection, the Certificate of Seaworthiness was invalid, and the master's Certificate of Competency had expired a month before the accident. It also noted that mistakes were made with the mayday alert, causing a 10-minute delay in deploying the RNLI and Coast Guard, which could have had a significant impact if the conditions of the incident had been worse. The ship's owners were financially ruined by the incident.

== See also ==
- List of shipwrecks in 2013
- List of large sailing vessels
