= Tubbataha Reef =

Protected area in the middle of the Sulu Sea

Tubbataha Reefs Natural Park
UNESCO World Heritage Site
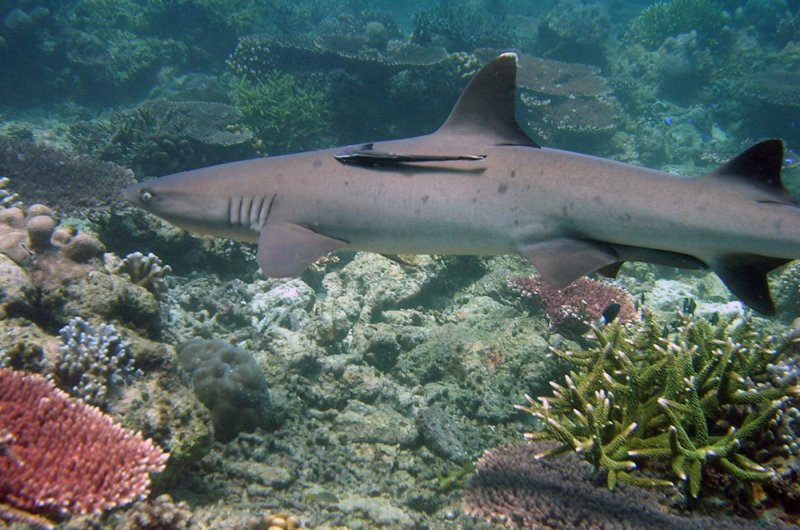
- Whitetip reef shark at Tubbataha

- Location within Palawan Location within Philippines
- Location: Cagayancillo, Palawan, Philippines
- Criteria: Natural: (vii), (ix), (x)
- Reference: 653bis
- Inscription: 1993 (17th Session)
- Extensions: 2009
- Area: 96,828 ha (239,270 acres)
- Coordinates: 8°57′12″N 119°52′3″E

Ramsar Wetland
- Official name: Tubbataha Reefs Natural Park
- Designated: November 12, 1999
- Reference no.: 1010

The Tubbataha Natural Park, also known as the Tubbataha Reefs Natural Park (Filipino: Bahurang Tubbataha), is a protected area of the Philippines located in the middle of the Sulu Sea. The marine and bird sanctuary consists of two huge atolls (named the North Atoll and South Atoll) and the smaller Jessie Beazley Reef covering a total area of 97,030 hectares (239,800 acres; 374.6 sq mi). It is located 150 kilometres (93 mi) southeast of Puerto Princesa, the capital of Palawan. The uninhabited islands and reefs are part of the island municipality of Cagayancillo, located roughly 130 kilometers (81 mi) to the northeast of the reef.

In December 1993, the UNESCO declared the Tubbataha Reefs National Park as a World Heritage Site as a unique example of an atoll reef with a very high density of marine species; the North Islet serving as a nesting site for birds and marine turtles. The site is an excellent example of a pristine coral reef with a spectacular 100-m perpendicular wall, extensive lagoons and two coral islands. In 1999, Ramsar listed Tubbataha as one of the wetlands of international importance. In 2008, the reef was nominated at New7Wonders of Nature.

The national park and the rest of the Philippine archipelago is part of the Coral Triangle, recognized as a center of marine biodiversity containing 75% of the described coral species and 40% of the world's reef fish. The area is under a grave threat due to overfishing and destructive fishing practices. Research of scientists visiting the reefs since the 1980s revealed that the Tubbataha Reefs Natural Park contains no less than 600 fish species, 360 coral species, 11 shark species, 13 dolphin and whale species, and 100 bird species. The reefs also serve as a nesting ground for Hawksbill and Green sea turtles.

== Geography ==
The natural park is located near the middle of Sulu Sea, 150 kilometers (93 mi) southeast of Puerto Princesa, covering a total of 97,030 hectares (239,800 acres; 374.6 sq mi). The smaller Jessie Beazley Reef is located about 20 kilometers (12 mi) north of the two atolls.

== Geology ==
Tubbataha Reef is situated on Cagayan Ridge, an extinct underwater volcano and an island arc during the Miocene. Being a true atoll structure, it is believed that the atolls of Tubbataha were formed as fringing reefs and volcanic islands. This follows the classical Charles Darwin's theory that atolls are formed around an existing volcanic island. When the volcanoes became extinct and the islands subsided over a long time, only the corals remained which then continuously grew towards the surface. The staircase-like slopes of the modern reef are now a product of the fluctuating sea levels as the crust under Cagayan Ridge cools and subsides.

== History ==
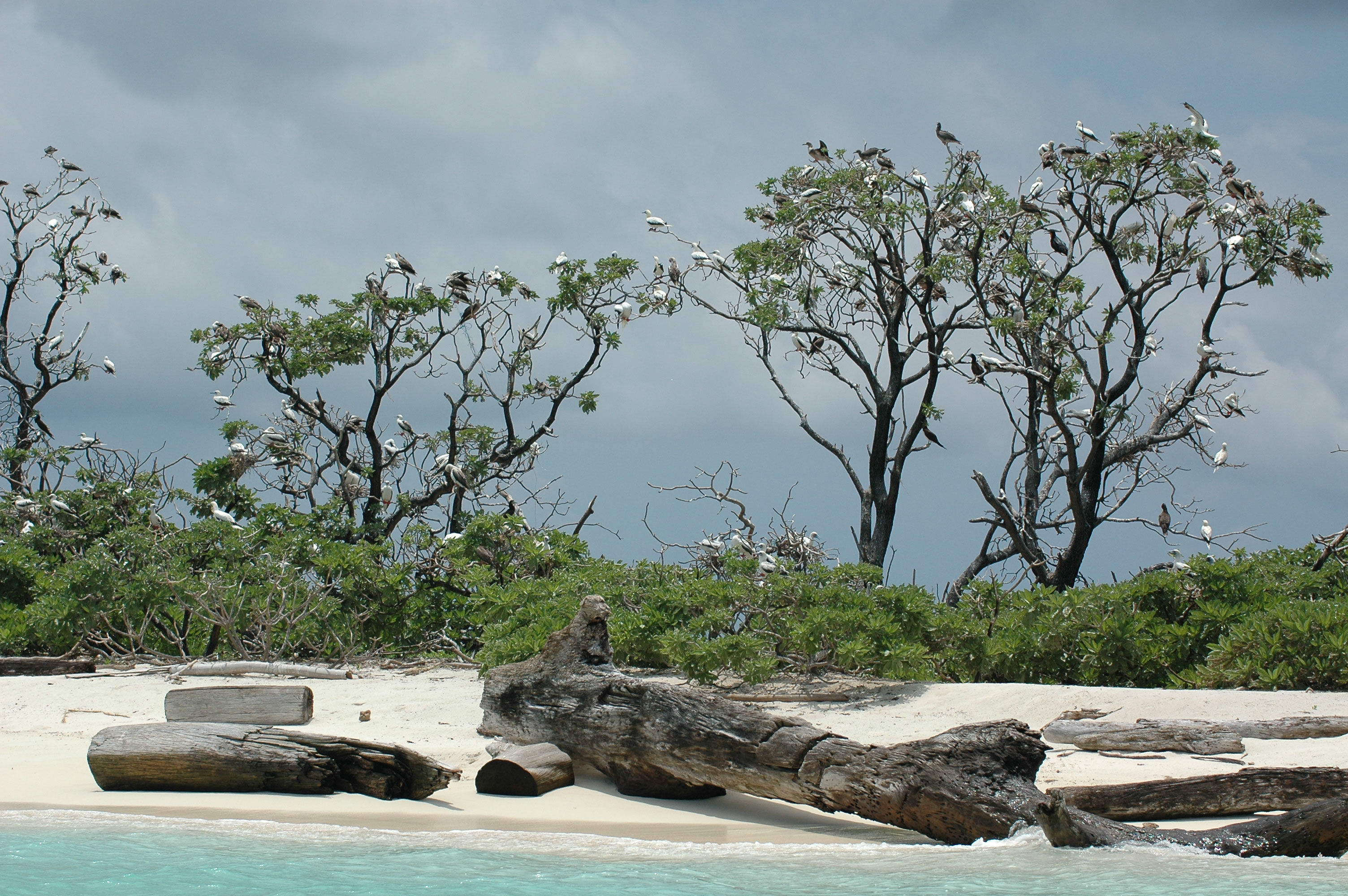
Tubbataha Reefs Natural Park, driftwood, palms, and birds

=== Etymology ===
The word tubbataha is a combination of two Sama–Bajau words: tubba and taha, which together means "a long reef exposed at low tide". Historically, Sama-Bajau peoples, who have a nomadic lifestyle, visit the reef from time to time. Although people from the islands of Cagayancillo are frequent visitors of the reef. They used the native vessel banka to sail and fish on "Gusong", their local name for the Tubbataha.

=== Protection ===
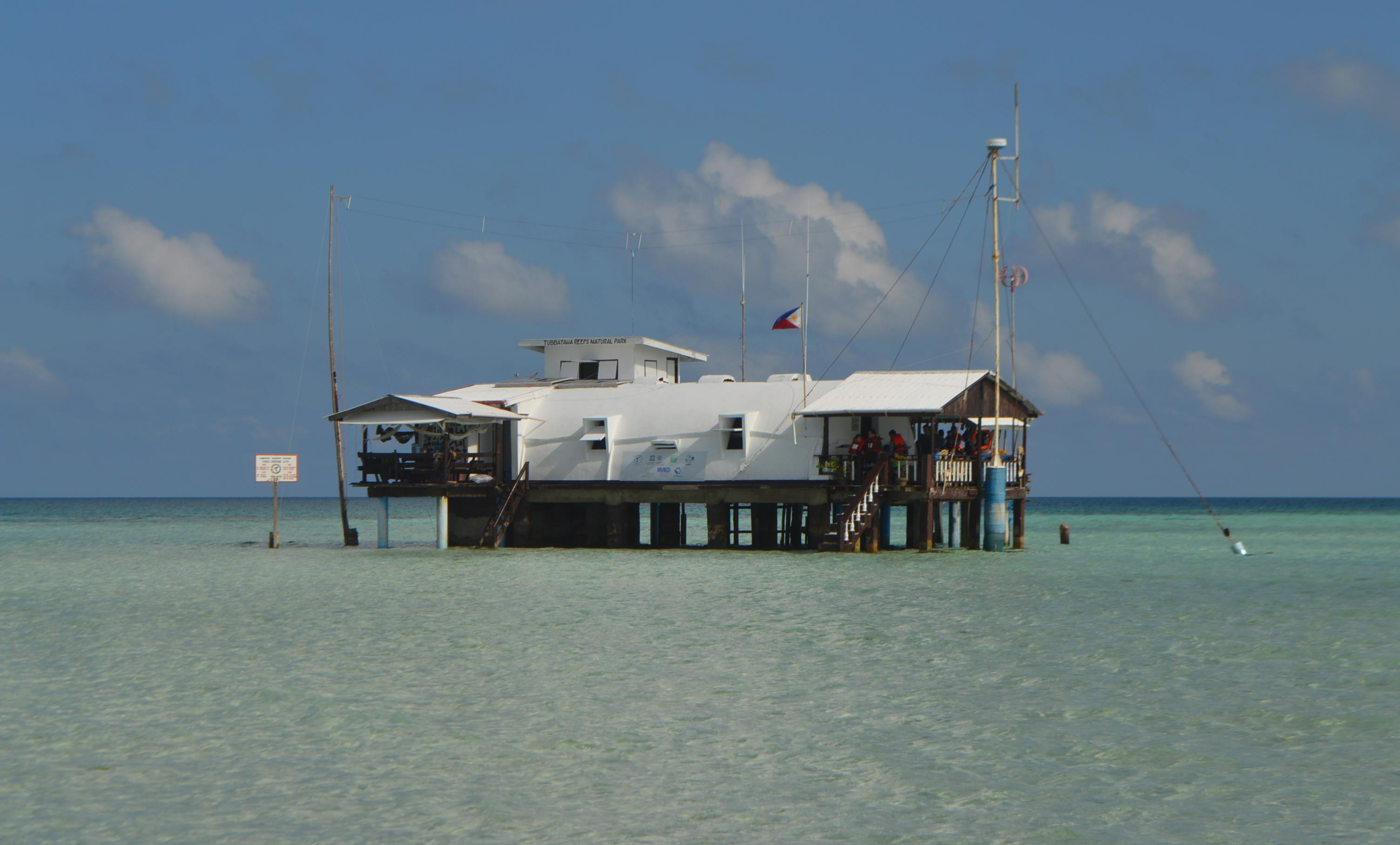
A remote ranger station in the middle of the Sulu Sea

Tubbataha's isolation, located in the middle of the Sulu Sea far from inhabitants of the nearest populated islands, had preserved its marine resources from over-exploitation over the years. The two islets in Tubbataha have no source of freshwater thus preventing habitation.

In the 1980s, fishermen reaching Tubbataha increased in numbers with the advent in motorized bangkas, instead of the traditional sailboats. Fish had declined in other fishing grounds because of overfishing and soon Tubbataha became a fishing destination because of its abundant marine life. Many fishermen used destructive fishing techniques like cyanide and dynamite fishing to maximize their catch.

Scuba divers and environmentalists campaigned to make the reefs a national marine park. With the endorsement of the Provincial Government of Palawan, on August 11, 1988, President Corazon Aquino signed Proclamation no. 306 establishing the two Tubbataha Reefs as a national marine park with an area of 332 square kilometres (82,000 acres). This was the first time that the Philippines had declared a marine area as a national park.

In the early years of law enforcement by the Presidential Task Force, the rangers were housed in a simple canvas tent. In 1996 a wooden structure was built but shifting sand soon rendered its foundations unstable. At present, the marine park rangers are housed in a styrofoam-reinforced concrete structure on the Southeast Islet on Tubbatha's North Atoll.

The National Marine Park was enlarged in 2006 to include the Jessie Beazley Reef. President Gloria Macapagal Arroyo signed Proclamation no. 1126 on August 23, which increased the boundaries of the park by 200% to 970.30 square kilometres (239,770 acres). The national park was also reclassified as a natural park. It is guarded by armed rangers 24 hours/7 days a week.

In 2013, during the 25th anniversary of the Tubbataha Reef's national park declaration, the World Wildlife Fund announced plans to construct a modernized ranger station on a different site to effectively monitor and deal with illegal poaching activities. The said project would cost PHP50 million.

=== Recognition ===
It was declared a World Heritage Site by the United Nations Educational, Scientific, and Cultural Organization (UNESCO) in December 1993 and falls under the protective management of the Department of National Defense (DND) of the Philippines. It is currently under technical supervision by the Palawan Council for Sustainable Development (PCSD) and the Department of Environment and Natural Resources (DENR).

In 1999, Ramsar listed Tubbataha as one of the Wetlands of International Importance because of the variety of its marine life species and valuable role as a habitat for various animals.

The Tubbataha Reef Natural Park was nominated by New7Wonders Foundation in the New 7 Wonders of Nature in 2007 but lost.

In November 2015, Tubbataha was declared by the ASEAN's Centre for Biodiversity as the 35th ASEAN Heritage Park.

On July 25, 2017, the Tubbataha Reef was designated as a Particularly Sensitive Sea Area (PSSA)—and an "area to be avoided"—by the International Maritime Organization.

== Management ==
Although the reefs are geographically part of the island municipality of Cagayancillo, Palawan, located roughly 130 kilometres (81 mi) to the northeast of the reef, the park is managed by the Tubbataha Management Office (TMO) in Puerto Princesa. The islands are uninhabited except for the rotating 10–12 park rangers at the Ranger's Station located at the southernmost tip of the North Atoll. The combined team from the Philippine Navy, Philippine Coast Guard, Municipality of Cagayancillo and the TMO. Stationed for two months at a time, their job is to protect the park from illegal activities including fishing and collection of other marine life.

== Ecology ==
Over 1000 species of marine life inhabit the reef with many considered endangered. Animal species found include manta rays, lionfish, sea turtles, clownfish, and sharks. Tubbataha has become a popular site for seasoned sport divers because of its coral "walls" where the shallow coral reef abruptly ends giving way to great depths. These "walls" are also habitats for many colonies of fish. Giant trevally (jacks), hammerhead sharks, barracudas, manta rays, palm-sized Moorish idols, napoleon wrasse, parrotfish, and moray eels live in the sanctuary. There also have been reported sightings of whale sharks and tiger sharks. Tubbataha is even home to cetaceans and hawksbill sea turtles (Eretmochelys imbricata) which are critically endangered species. Being a UNESCO World Heritage site, all living organisms are protected.

Vivid corals cover more than two-thirds of the area and the waters around the reef are places of refuge for numerous marine lives. The seemingly diverse ecosystem of this sanctuary rivals the Great Barrier Reef – having 350 coral species and 500 fish species. In June 2009 an outbreak of the crown-of-thorns starfish was observed, possibly affecting the ecological functioning of this relatively pristine coral reef.

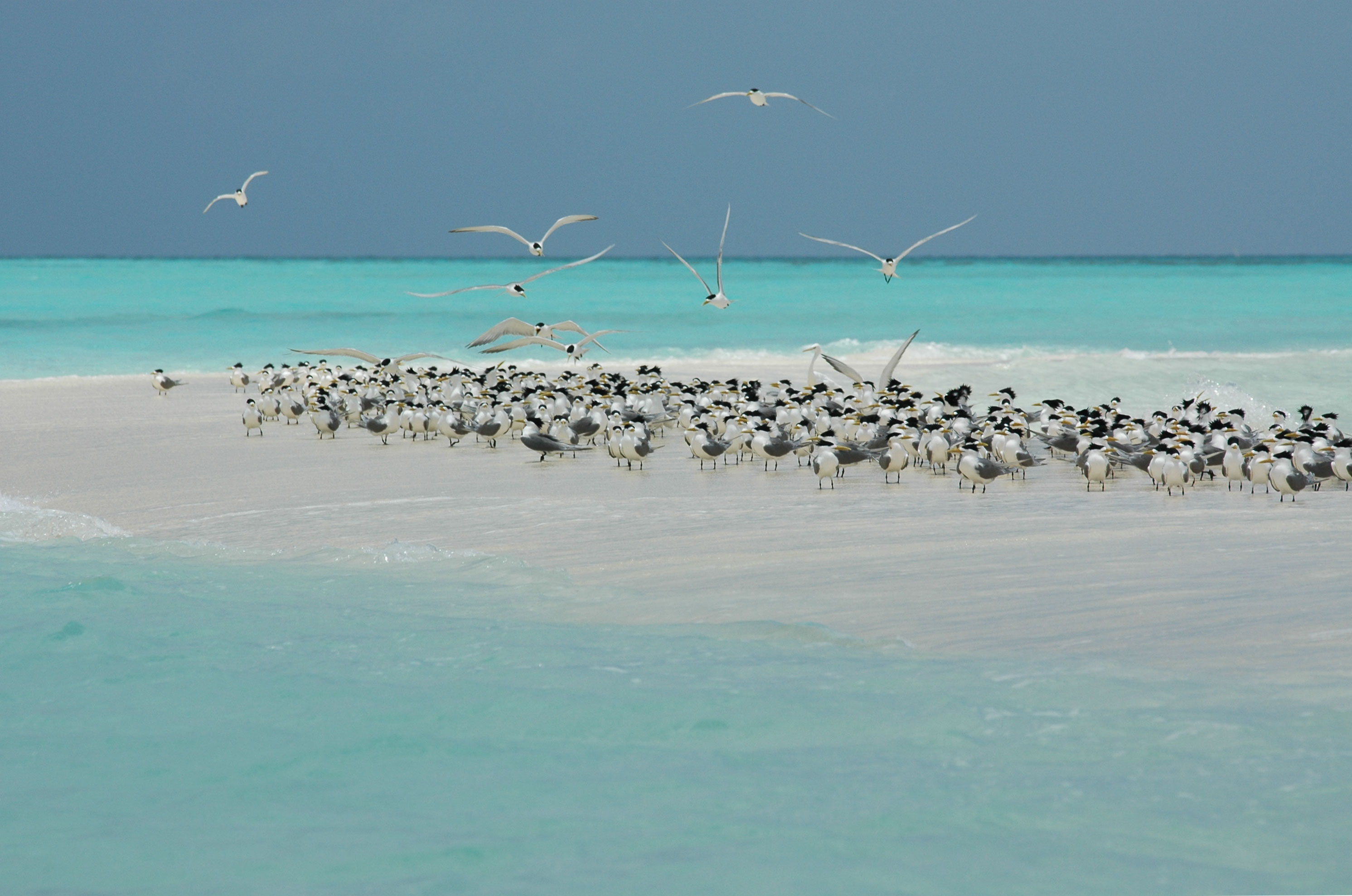

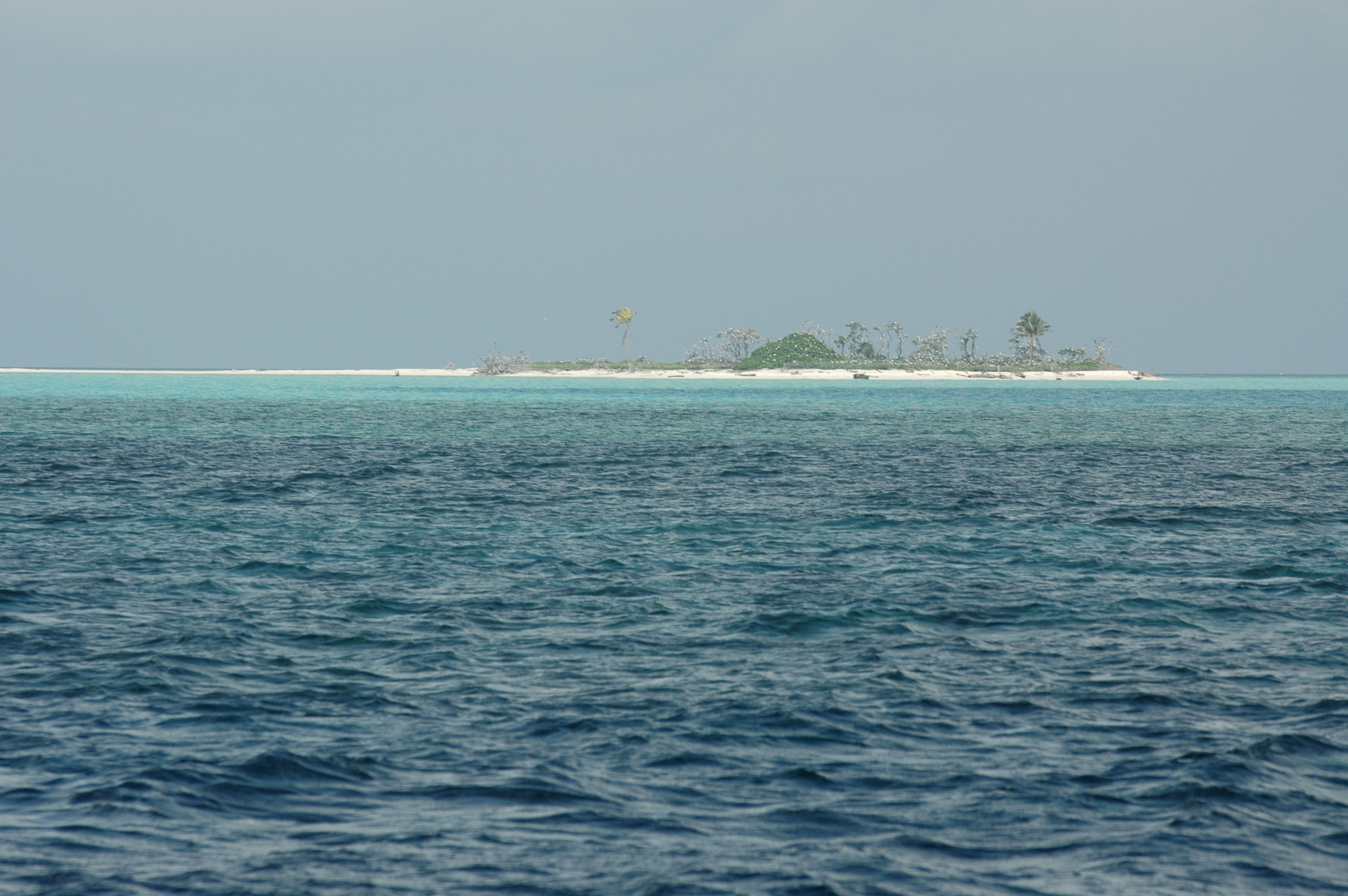

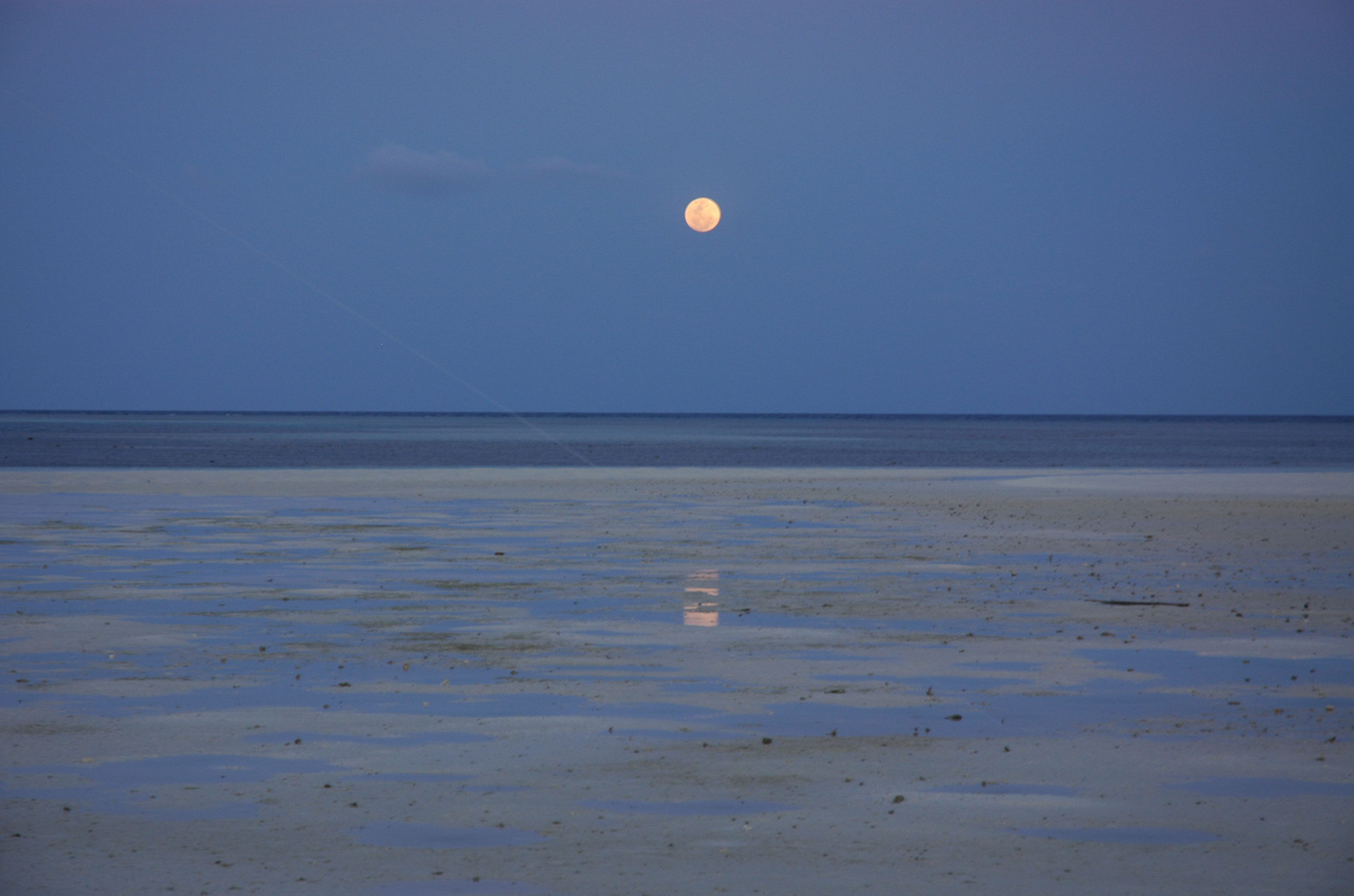

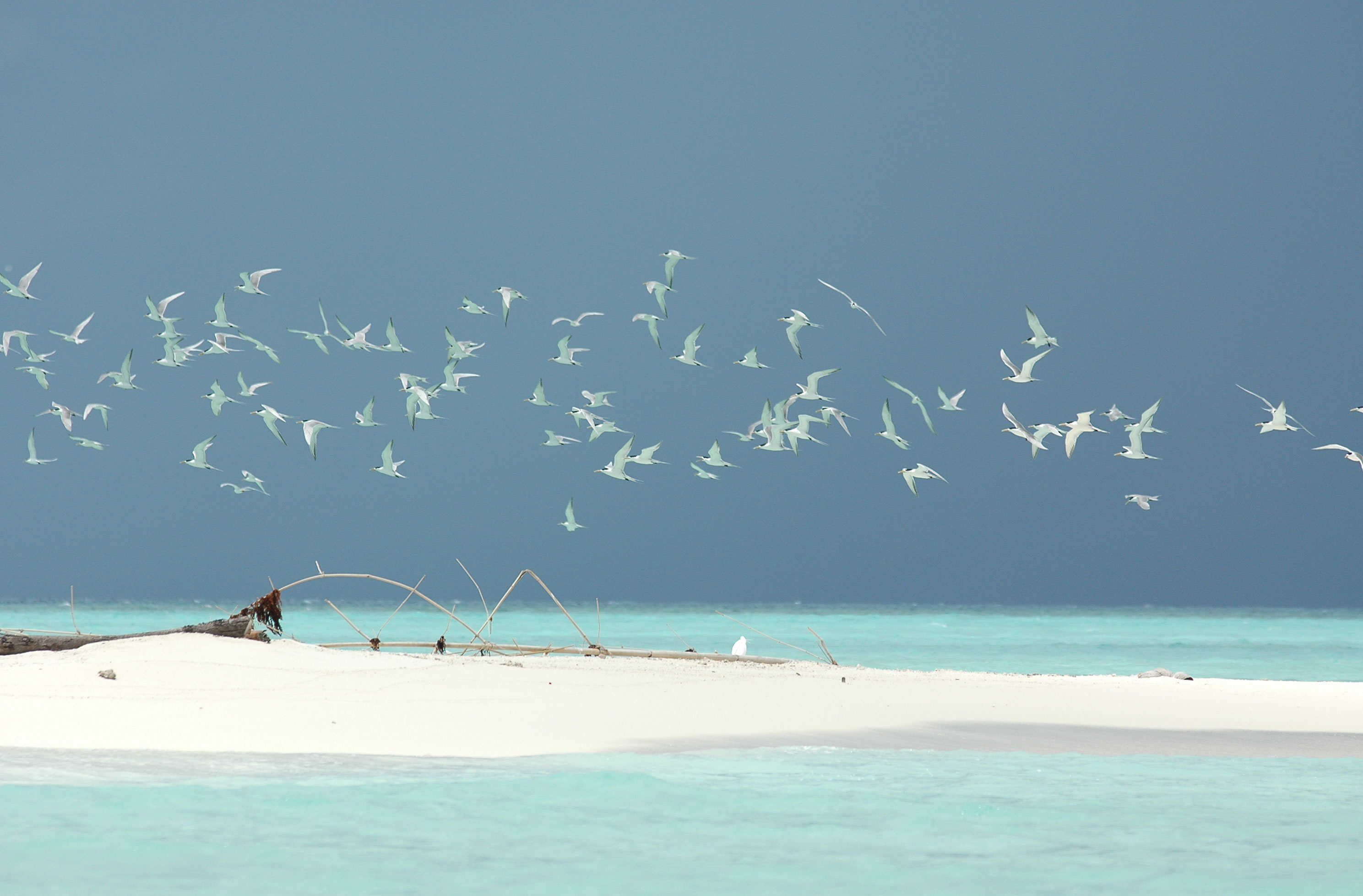

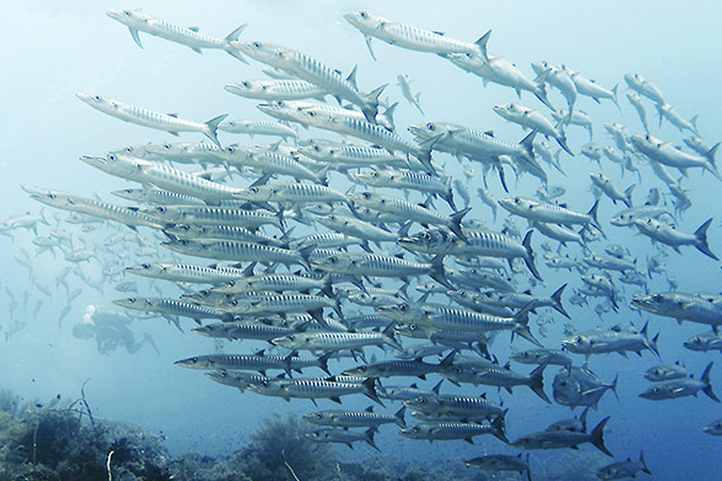
Battery of barracuda taken in Tubbataha

== Tourism ==
Tubbataha is considered one of the best dive sites in the world according to CNN Travel. Trips to Tubbataha National Marine Park from Puerto Princesa operate during the diving season from mid-March to mid-June, the period where the waves are calmest, skies clear and water visibility of about 30 to 45 metres (98 to 148 ft). The park is about ten hours by boat from the city. All trips are vessel-based or "liveaboard" as there are no accommodation facilities. Visitors stay on the yacht/boat throughout their stay in the park. During the diving season, ships dedicated for diving are usually booked years in advance especially during Easter and the Asian holidays called "Golden Week".

As of March 2011, the park entrance fee for individuals is pegged at US$75.00 or PHP3,000.00. In September 2010, Palawan governor Abraham Kahlil Mitra announced that local residents of Palawan province can enter the Tubbataha Reef without paying the conservation fee. Divers are advised to book their trips towards the middle or end of April as calm seas from April to June have a short window.

Although the sand bars around Tubbataha are considered off limits to human beings, tourists are allowed to set foot at the Ranger Station where they can purchase souvenirs and tour the facility.

₱1000 bill- The park is featured on the reverse side of the 2010 series of the Philippine one thousand peso bill.

== Ship grounding incidents ==
=== YMS 340 ===
In October 1945, the auxiliary motor minesweeper YMS 340 ran hard aground on Tubbataha Reef causing minor damage to the reef. Te USS Leland E. Thomas (DE 420) was unable to pull YMS 340 from the reef and radioed for assistance. The USS Gillette DE 681 arrived and YMS 340 was towed off the reef and escorted to Manila by the USS Gillette and the US Navy Tug Vireo.

=== Rainbow Warrior ===
On October 31, 2005, the Greenpeace ship Rainbow Warrior ran aground on Tubbataha Reef accidentally damaging approximately 100 square metres (1,100 sq ft) of reef for which they paid a fine of about $7,000. Greenpeace blamed the accident on inaccurate charts provided by the Philippine government. The BBC quoted Greenpeace official Red Constantino as saying "The chart indicated we were a mile and a half" from the coral reef when the ship ran aground. Greenpeace paid a fine.

=== USS Guardian ===
On January 17, 2013, the US Navy minesweeper USS Guardian ran aground at Tubbataha Reef. The U.S. Government initially blamed the grounding on faulty maps. Between 2011 and January 2013, before the grounding of the USS Guardian, there were eleven incidents involving ships, including two Philippine ships. The U.S. Navy concluded that towing the ship off the reef would cause more damage and decided to dismantle the ship in place. On March 30, the last section of the ship was removed from the reef. No evidence of fuel leakage from the grounded vessel were found.

On April 8, 2013, the U.S. Navy turned over digital navigation charts and other relevant documents and data of the Guardian to the Philippine Maritime Casualty Investigating Team (MCIT) and responded to various technical and substantive queries. The MCIT conducted its own independent investigation and made recommendations on how to avoid such incidents in the future.

The U.S. Government apologized for the incident and relieved five officers from duty. The initial investigation clearly indicated that these officers did not adhere to standard US Navy navigation procedures.

The World Wide Fund for Nature–Philippines and the Tubbataha Management Office, measured the damage area at 2,345.67 square meters (25,248.6 sq ft). The U.S. Federal Government was assessed a fine of 24,000 Philippine pesos (about US$600) per square meter. On January 20, 2015, the United States Government paid to the Philippine government a total of 87 million Philippine pesos, or US$1.97 million – 59 million Philippine pesos for the damage and another 29 million pesos to reimburse for services provided by the Philippine Coast Guard.

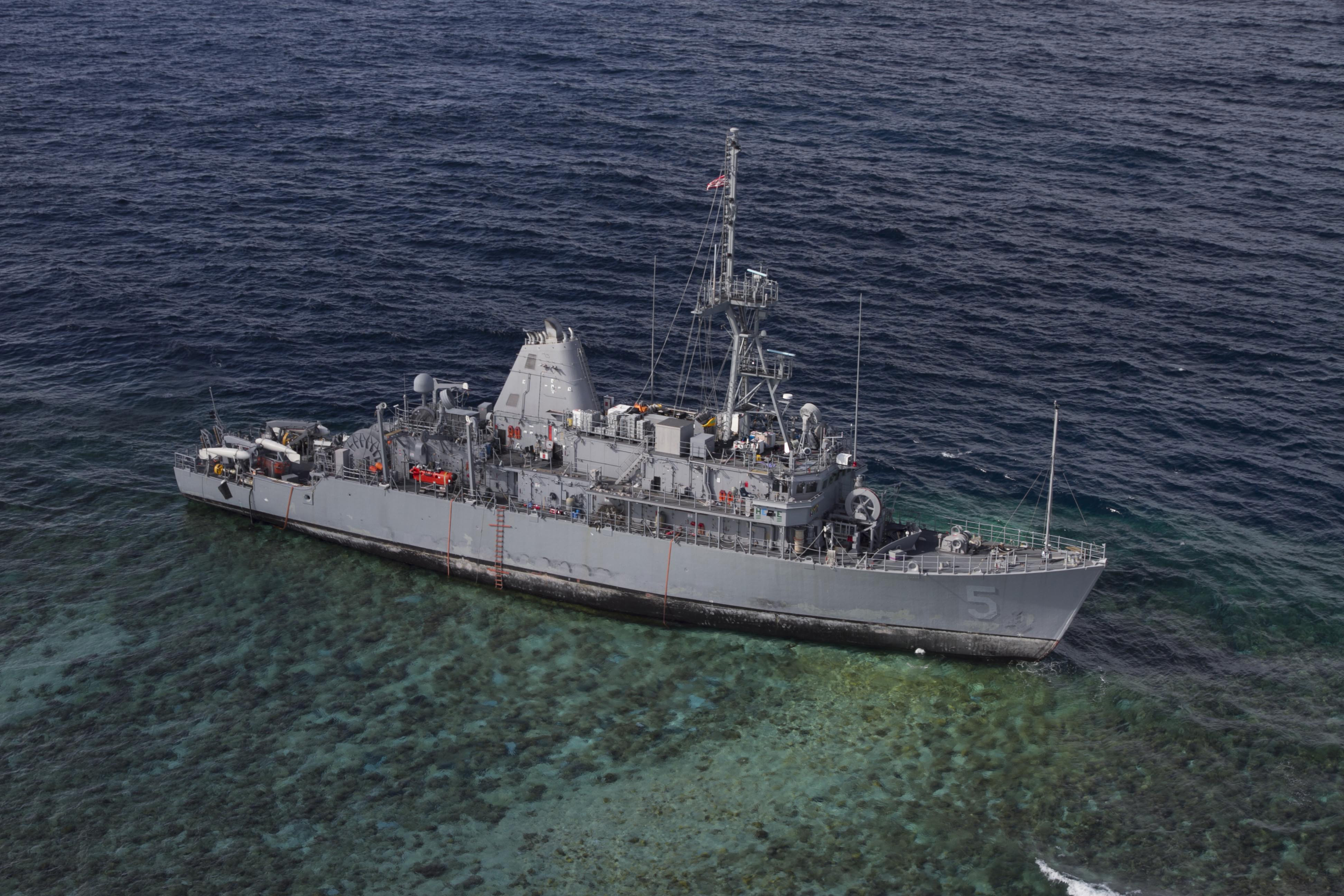
The USS Guardian aground in January 2013

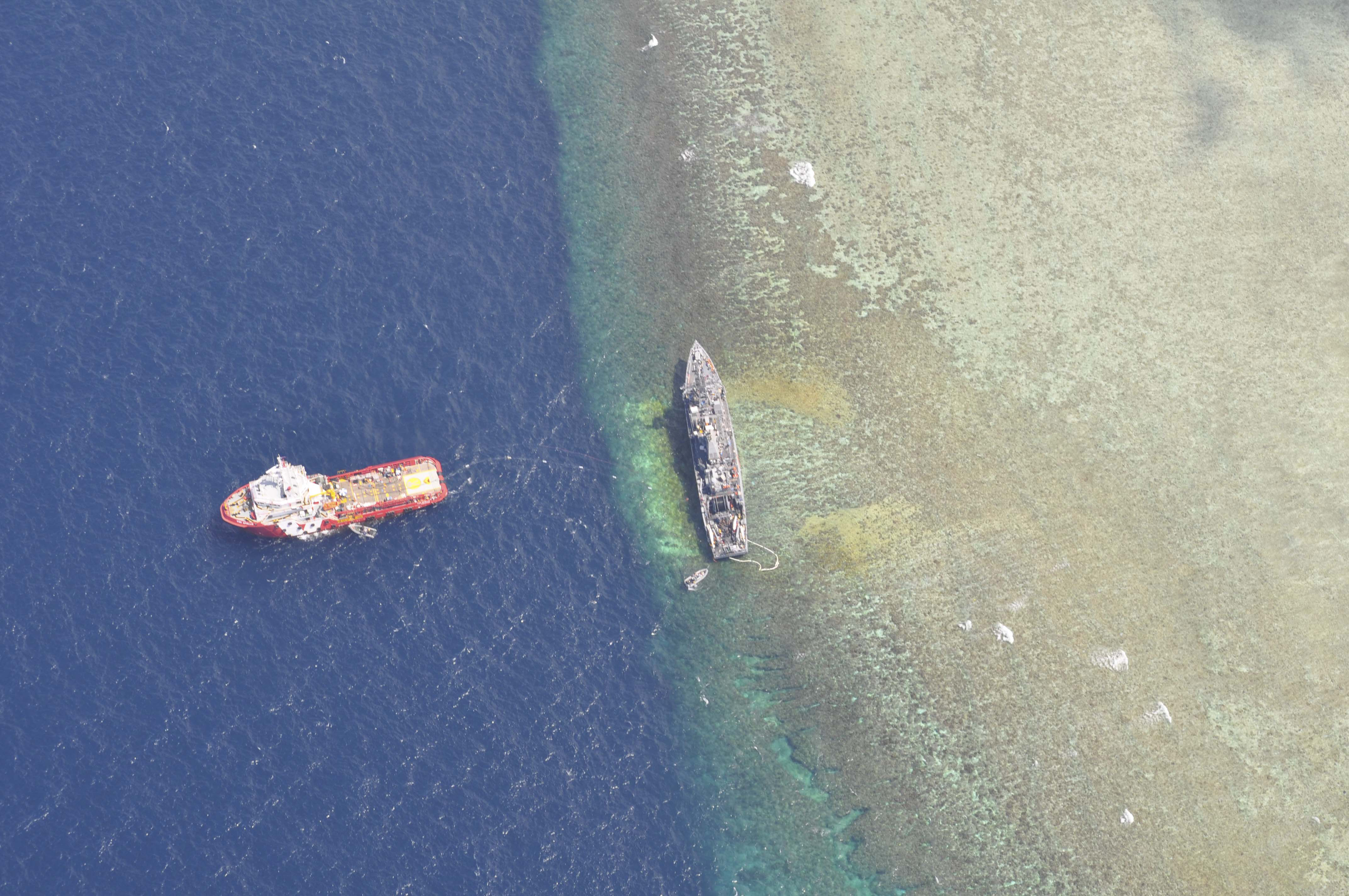
The USS Guardian aground as seen from above

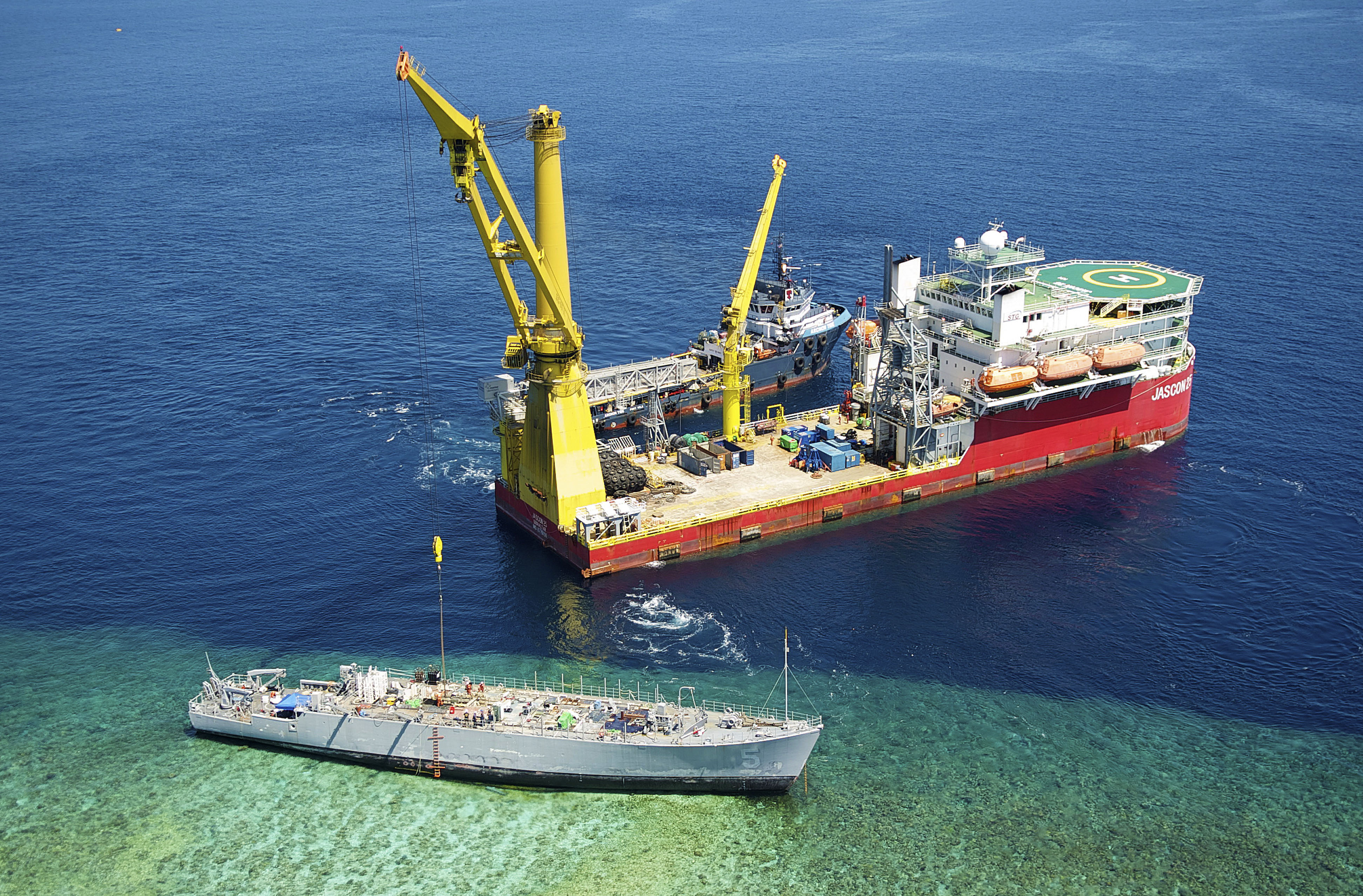
The ship on March 12, 2013, as it was being salvaged by Jascon25

=== F/V Min Long Yu ===
On April 8, 2013, the F/V Min Long Yu, a Chinese fishing vessel, ran aground some 1.1 nautical miles (2.0 km; 1.3 mi) nautical miles east of the Tubbataha Reef ranger station. The fishing vessel had 12 crew members and was suspected of illegal fishing. On board, what was found instead were 400 boxes of frozen pangolins of unknown origin.

== See also ==
- List of World Heritage Sites in the Philippines
- List of protected areas of the Philippines
- List of reefs
- ASEAN Heritage Parks
- National Geospatial-Intelligence Agency
- Apo Reef
- Verde Island Passage
