= MV Emsstrom =

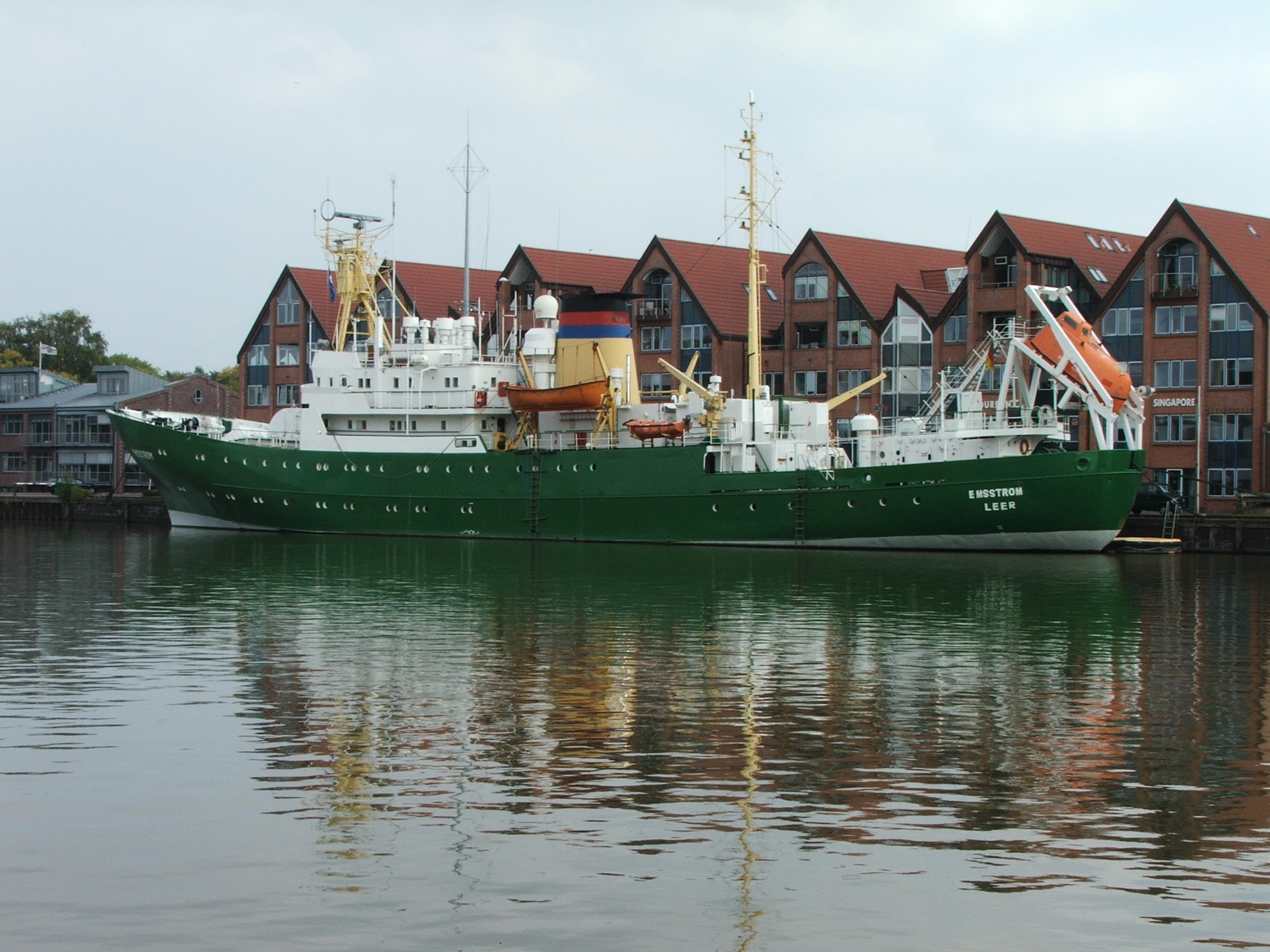
- Emsstrom in Leer, Germany (September 2009)

History
- Name: Frithjof (1968–1997); Emsstrom (1998–2013)
- Builder: Schlichting-Werft
- Completed: 1968
- Identification: Call sign: DFQO; IMO number: 6922705; MMSI number: 211278890
- Fate: Sunk off Torquay, England

General characteristics
- Tonnage: 1,716 GRT
- Displacement: 2,310 tons
- Length: 76.76 m (251.8 ft)
- Beam: 77.79 m (255.2 ft)
- Draft: max. 5.14 m (16.9 ft)
- Installed power: 2,800 hp
- Propulsion: Diesel-electric transmission
- Speed: 15 knots (28 km/h; 17 mph)
- Crew: 35

Emsstrom was a German fishery protection vessel for the Federal Ministry of Food, Agriculture and Consumer Protection built as Frithjof in 1968 at Schlichting-Werft in Travemünde.

In 1998, the ship was renamed Emsstrom and used as a naval training ship in Leer, Germany, until 2012.

In January 2013, Emsstrom was under tow by the Greek tug Christos XXII (IMO number 7230135) where she was destined for Turkey to be scrapped. When Christos XXII anchored to investigate a list that Emsstrom had developed, Emsstrom collided with its side just after 20:58 UTC on 13 January.

Emsstrom later sank approximately 2.5 nautical miles east by north from Hope's Nose, Torquay, England, in 23 m (75 ft) of water.

Christos XXII sustained a 40 cm (16 in) gash in her hull and was towed to Portland for repairs.
