= Golden Week =

Golden Week may refer to:

- Golden Week (China), several weeks of Chinese holidays, occurring in January or February, May 1st, and September or October
- Golden Week (Japan), several Japanese holidays that occur during the first week of May
- Golden Week (Ohio), an early voting period in Ohio, US
