= Golden Week (Ohio) =

Golden Week is the colloquial term for a unique period of early voting time during Ohio's election season in which citizens can register to vote and cast an absentee ballot on the same day.

== History ==
Golden Week was created in 2005 with new early voting legislation that allowed voters to cast absentee ballots up to 35 days before the election. The legislation was passed in response to vast complications and inefficiencies experienced during the 2004 presidential election. On top of the technical issues with vote counting and voting machines, there were many logistical issues that discouraged turnout and voter participation. Electoral precincts were ill-equipped to handle the number of voters coming out, and in some cases waiting lines were reported to be as high as nine hours long. This expansion of voting time resulted in about a week of overlap with the deadline of voter registration, which was October 6.

== Usage ==
As with any period of early voting, citizens used Golden Week (and the rest of the period that did not overlap with registration deadlines) as an opportunity to cast their ballots at a time more convenient for them than Election Day itself. The added ability to vote on the same day of registration created an ideal opportunity for those who could not afford to take too much time out of their work schedules, or other obligations. While people from all walks of life have reasons to take advantage of early voting, the practice is more often associated with minorities and low-income citizens. The number of people who took advantage of these opportunities proved to be considerable. During the 2012 general election, approximately 90,000 people cast votes during Golden Week, which translated to about 14% of the total early, in-person absentee ballots cast that year.

There were several instances of organized intent to take advantage of the opportunities provided by Golden Week, as well. Many predominantly African-American churches coordinated "Souls to the Polls" campaigns designed to encourage their communities to get registered and exercise their voting rights.

== Contention and elimination ==
Golden Week and early voting opportunities in general have been the subject of much debate among policymakers. Some see early voting as a safeguard against the disenfranchisement of minority and lower-income citizens who are believed to use such services more often. According to some studies, there is truth to this. Data from the Pew Research Center states that youth, minorities and the poor are much more likely to be nonvoters Corroborated with research from Caltech and MIT, it becomes clearer why this might be the case. Their study found that a multitude of reasons for not voting are more often used by minorities and youth than whites and older citizens. These reasons include illness, being too busy, or not having the proper transportation. It is factors such as those that lead many to believe that having ample early voting opportunities is particularly beneficial to those demographics. In addition to that, some believe that early voting opportunities help offset logistical issues during election day, and promote a larger overall voter turnout. Others see offering voting opportunities to the extent that Ohio has as a waste of resources and as a detriment to informed decision-making. To some, voting too early before an election represents making too hasty a decision, as important information can surface any time that has potential to shift opinions. Others believe that tighter voting procedures help minimize fraud. As such, Ohio's voting policies have been an ever-present topic in the state's political arena.

=== NAACP v. Husted ===
This debate came to a head in 2014 when the Ohio House passed Senate Bill 238, which eliminated Golden Week. This action was followed by a directive from Secretary of State John Husted, which set statewide early voting hours to be used in forthcoming elections. Husted's opponents criticized the directive for its lack of evening hours, as well as for not providing hours on Sundays or on the Monday prior to Election Day. The discontent with these measures eventually prompted the American Civil Liberties Union to file a lawsuit that came to be known as NAACP v. Husted, as the complaint was filed on behalf of several civil rights groups including the Ohio Conference of the National Association for the Advancement of Colored People and the League of Women Voters of Ohio. The case was contested until it made its way to the US Supreme Court, which did not fully consider the case but still stayed the decision of the lower courts to uphold Husted's legislation. Due to persistent action by the ACLU, however, a new compromise was reached in April 2015, in which Husted agreed to restore some weekend and evening voting hours. Golden Week remained eliminated.

There has been discontent since the elimination of Golden Week from invested groups such as the ACLU, but until recently there has not been much action in the form of concentrated effort to reinstate the lost voting time. As of November 2015, attorneys have filed a new lawsuit representing Ohio Democrats aimed at getting the judiciary to reexamine the state's voting policies regarding early ballot opportunities as well as rules on provisional ballots.
