= MV Hansa Brandenburg =

History
- Name: Hansa Brandenburg (2002–2003); Maersk Auckland (2003–2007); Tiger Jade (2007–2011); Hansa Brandenburg (2011–2013)
- Owner: Schiffahrts-Gesellschaft "Hansa Brandenburg" mbH & Co. KG
- Operator: Leonhardt & Blumberg
- Port of registry: Liberia, Monrovia
- Builder: Guangzhou Wenchong Shipyard, Guangzhou, People's Republic of China
- Yard number: GWS291
- Laid down: March 31, 2002
- Launched: July 23, 2002
- Completed: December 30, 2002
- In service: 2002–2013
- Identification: IMO number: 9236236; Call sign: A8ES9; MMSI number: 636090754
- Fate: Damaged by fire in 2013; sold for scrap

General characteristics
- Type: Container ship
- Tonnage: 18,334 GT; 10,744 NT; 23,493 DWT
- Length: 175.53 m (575 ft 11 in)
- Beam: 27.40 m (89 ft 11 in)
- Draft: 10.905 m (35 ft 9.3 in)
- Depth: 14.30 m (46 ft 11 in)
- Ice class: GL E
- Installed power: MAN B&W 7S60MC-C (15,785 kW)
- Propulsion: Single shaft; fixed-pitch propeller; Bow thruster (900 kW)
- Speed: 19 knots (35 km/h; 22 mph)
- Capacity: 1,740 TEU
- Crew: 17

MV Hansa Brandenburg was a 2002-built Liberian-flagged container ship operated by the German shipping company Leonhardt & Blumberg. On July 15, 2013, one of the containers on board the vessel caught fire forcing the crew of 17 to abandon ship about 200 nautical miles (370 km; 230 mi) northeast of Mauritius.

== General characteristics ==
Hansa Brandenburg was 175.53 metres (576 ft) long and had a beam of 27.40 metres (89 ft 11 in). Fully laden, she drew 10.9 metres (35 ft 9 in) of water. Her container capacity, measured in twenty-foot equivalent units (TEU), was 1,740. For loading and unloading, she had two 40-ton cranes. Hansa Brandenburg was served by a crew of 17.

Hansa Brandenburg was propelled by a single MAN B&W 7S60MC-C low-speed crosshead diesel engine manufactured under licence in China. The main engine, which had an output of 15,785 kW (21,168 hp), was directly coupled to a fixed-pitch propeller which gave the ship a service speed of 19 knots (35 km/h; 22 mph). For maneuvering at ports, Hansa Brandenburg had a 900 kW bow thruster.

== Career ==
Hansa Brandenburg was built in 2002 by Guangzhou Wenchong Shipyard in Guangzhou, People's Republic of China. She was known as Maersk Auckland in 2003–2007 and Tiger Jade in 2007–2011 before reverting to her former name.

=== 2013 fire ===
On July 15, 2013, one of the containers onboard Hansa Brandenburg caught fire while the ship was en route from Singapore to Durban. Unable to fight the fire that had spread to the superstructure, the crew of 17 was forced to abandon ship about 200 nautical miles (370 km; 230 mi) northeast of Mauritius. The crew was rescued by another container ship, Donau Trader. By July 18, a salvage tug had arrived at the scene and on the following day it was reported that the fire had been brought under control.

On July 22, it was announced the ship was under tow and a final decision on the port of refuge was yet to be made. Further assessment of damage to the vessel would follow upon arrival. The vessel was eventually towed to Port Louis, Mauritius.

According to NGO Shipbreaking Platform, Hansa Brandenburg was sold for scrapping in Southeast Asia, likely India.

The Hansa Brandenburg fire was the second serious accident involving a container ship in the Indian Ocean during the summer of 2013. On June 17, the 8,100 TEU container ship MOL Comfort broke in two 200 nautical miles (370 km; 230 mi) off the coast of Yemen and the stern section sank ten days later. A salvage was attempted on the bow section, but on July 6 a fire broke out and it sank four days later.
