= Hope's Nose =

Headland on the south coast of Devon, England

- Headland
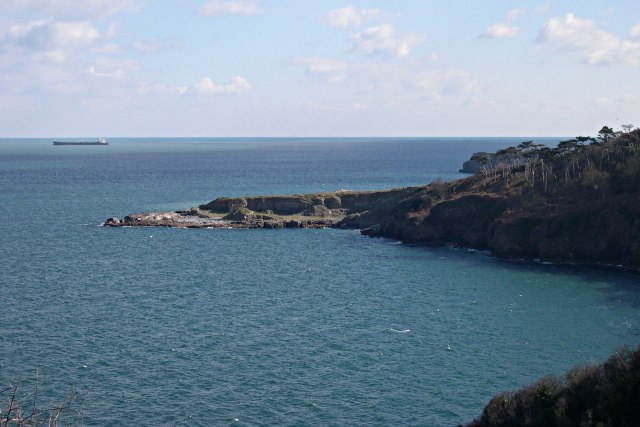
- Hope's Nose

- Location in Devon
- Coordinates: 50.4619°N 3.4841°W
- Grid position: SX 9475 6350
- Location: Torquay, Devon
- Geology: Devonian Limestone
- Designation: Site of Special Scientific Interest

Hope's Nose is a coastal headland, separating Tor Bay from Babbacombe Bay. It is visible from much of the town and harbour of Torquay, Devon. It has been a Site of Special Scientific Interest along with the nearby Wall's Hill since 1986.

== History ==
During the 19th century gold was found at the headland. Samples of this can be seen at the Natural History Museum in London.
