= Pama-As Gintong Bai Award =

Philippine commemorative award

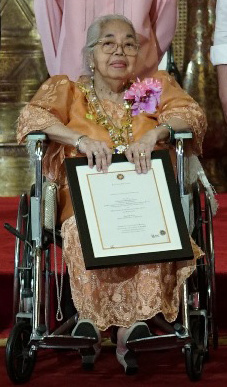
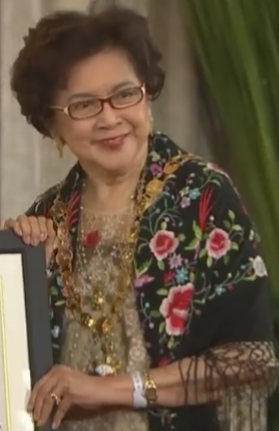
- Two of 31 awardees; Amelia Lapeña-Bonifacio (left) and Fides Cuyugan-Asensio (right)
- Awarded for: "their services to the Filipino people in various disciplines of media arts and broadcast, cinema, dance, literature, music, theater, visual arts, cultural heritage conservation, and promotion of the Filipino language."
- Date: July 7, 2005
- Country: Philippines
- Presented by: National Commission for Culture and the Arts
- Status: One-time
- Website: about_ncca/pr-gintongbai

The Pama-As Gintong Bai Award (also called Centennial Women Award or simply Gintong Bai Award) is a commemorative award given by the National Commission for Culture and the Arts. It was presented by President Gloria Macapagal Arroyo at the Malacañang Palace on July 7, 2005 to thirty-one women for their lifelong contributions to Philippine culture, arts, and heritage conservation.

== History ==
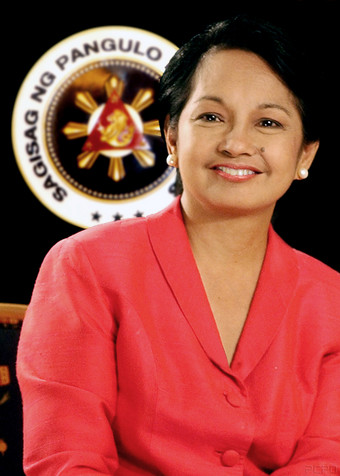
President Gloria Macapagal-Arroyo presented the award in 2005 at the Malacañang Palace.

The Pama-As Gintong Bai Award was established as a joint initiative between the National Commission for Culture and the Arts (NCCA) and the Office of the Presidential Advisor on Culture. The award was created to "honor eminent Filipinas aged 65 years old and above" and as a gesture of "appreciation for their services to the Filipino people" that, according to NCCA Executive Director Cecile Guidote-Alvarez, had often remained unrecognized.

The award's inception was a direct response to Presidential Proclamation No. 622, issued on April 29, 2004, which designated 2005 as the "Centennial Year of the Feminist Movement of the Philippines." Under the theme "A Salute to Women in the Arts and Heritage Preservation," the inaugural ceremony was held at the Rizal Hall of Malacañang Palace on July 7, 2005, where President Gloria Macapagal-Arroyo conferred the honors. According to NCCA Executive Director Cecile Guidote-Alvarez, the award was intended to parallel the UNESCO-International Theater Institute’s global recognition of women artists and served as a state-level acknowledgment of women’s roles in nation-building. The 2005 conferment recognized 31 women across diverse disciplines, including cinema, dance, literature, music, theater, visual arts, and heritage conservation.

The selection process was conducted by a board of judges led by National Museum director Corazon Alvina, National Library director Prudenciana Cruz, and various NCCA commissioners. The recipients were each presented with a certificate of recognition, a specially hand-embroidered jusi handkerchief, and a cash grant of ₱10,000.

== Recipients ==
The following are the recipients of the Pama-As Gintong Bai Award conferred by President Gloria Macapagal-Arroyo at the Malacañang Palace on July 7, 2005, honoring women from "various disciplines of media arts and broadcast, cinema, dance, literature, music, theater, visual arts, cultural heritage conservation, and promotion of the Filipino language."

Recipient	Category
Gloria Romero	Cinema
Anita Linda	Cinema
Mona Lisa	Cinema
Tiya Dely	Media and Broadcast Arts
Paz Cielo Belmonte	Dance
Corazon Iñigo	Dance
Gilda Cordero-Fernando	Literature
Genoveva Matute	Literature
Rosalinda Orosa	Literature
Azucena Grajo Uranza	Literature
Fides Cuyugan-Asensio	Music
Ernestina Crisologo	Music
Carmencita Lozada	Music
Amelia Lapeña-Bonifacio	Theater
Rustica Carpio	Theater
Natividad Crame-Rogers	Theater
Araceli Limcaco-Dans	Visual Arts
Anita Magsaysay-Ho	Visual Arts
Rosario Bitanga	Visual Arts
Sonia Santiago-Olivares	Interior Design
Isabel Santos	Costume Design
Delia Coronel	Promotion of Intangible Heritage (Darangan Literature)
Esperanza Bunag Gatbonton	Conservation
Ana Maria Harper	Conservation
Carmen Guerrero Nakpil	Historian
Rosario Mendoza Cortez	Historian
Gloria Santos	Historian
Estefania Aldaba-Lim	Museum
Leonora San Agustin	Museum
Nieves Valdez	Museum
Consuelo Paz	Promotion of Filipino Language
