= National Archives of the Philippines =

Government agency of the Philippines

Coordinates: 14°34′55.37″N 120°58′51.73″E

- Pambansang Sinupan ng Pilipinas
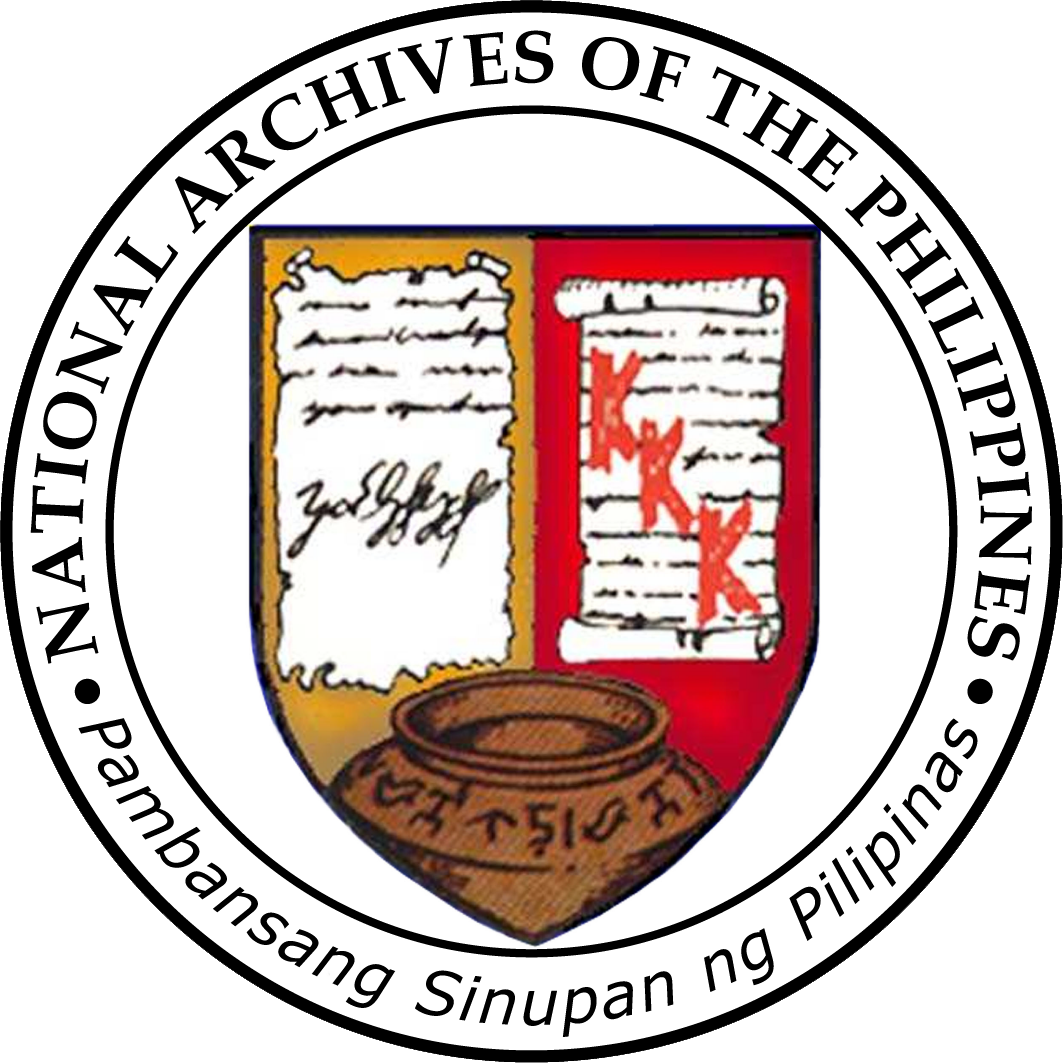

Agency overview
- Formed: June 12, 2007
- Preceding agency: Records Management and Archives Office
- Headquarters: National Library of the Philippines, Manila, Philippines
- Employees: 123 (2024)
- Annual budget: ₱85,146,000 (2012)
- Agency executive: Victorino Manalo, Director
- Key document: Republic Act No. 9470
- Website: nationalarchives.gov.ph

The National Archives of the Philippines (NAP; Filipino: Pambansang Sinupan ng Pilipinas) is an agency of the government of the Philippines mandated to collect, store, preserve and make available archival records of the government and other primary sources pertaining to the history of the country. It is the primary records management agency, tasked to formulate and implement the records schedule and vital records protection programs for the government. The central archives as they are organized today are a result of the passage of Republic Act No. 9470 in 2007, but its roots can be traced back to at least the 19th century during Spanish rule.

== History ==
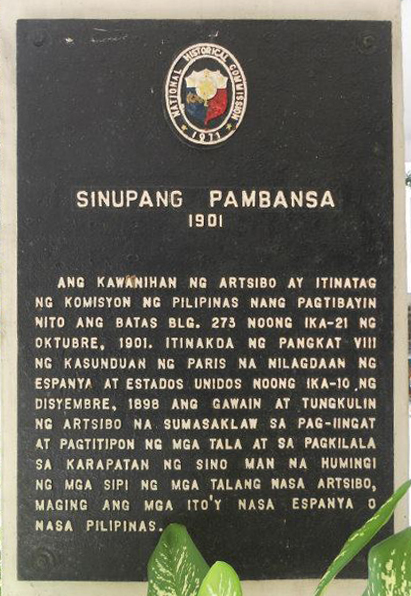
Historical marker unveiled in 1975

The central institution commenced from the Division of Archives delegated by the Spanish captaincy over the Philippines in the 19th century. Before that time, the vast majority of the colonial records were scattered among the islands and held in mostly religious centers of the Catholic Church. However, in 1898, Spain ceded its claims over the Philippines to the United States of America through the Treaty of Paris. Article VIII of the treaty authorized Philippine records in the islands and in Spain to be under the new stewardship of the American government. As a result, the Office of Archives was officially established. The Americans appointed a "keeper of the Spanish Archive," who acted, essentially, as the director of the archive. This was an important position since the Archives was placed under the control of various government agencies. First, it was placed under the Executive Bureau in 1901. Within the same year, it moved to the Department of Public Instruction. In 1915, it was transferred back to the Executive Bureau and was reduced to the Division of Archives, Patents, Copyrights, and Trademarks. The following year, this division was consolidated with the Philippine Library and Museum. In 1928, it became the Division of Archives under the renamed National Library.

During the post-war period, the Archive transferred from the National Library to the Department of General Services. In 1958, President Carlos Garcia issued Executive Order no. 290 establishing the Bureau of Records Management under the said department. The Archive's responsibilities included to plan, develop, and coordinate government-wide programs, policies, rules, and regulations governing the use, storage, and disposition of current operating records of permanent or historical value. The department was composed of three divisions namely the Current Records Division, the Archives Division, and the Records Storage Division. It was the Archives Division which stored and rehabilitated records of permanent value and of historical interest.

The bureau's international linkages for the period were very much limited. Since it was within the American-patterned Department of General Services, its trainings were provided by the US Agency for International Development-National Economic Council. Three of its personnel were trained by UNESCO reprography expert Ramunajan Chari in 1968 on microfilming and archival documents reproduction through a mobile microfilm unit. The bureau was represented by its director, historian Domingo Abella, in the International Council of Archives and its Southeast Asian Branch (SARBICA).

The archive was elevated from a bureau to an office in 1972, with the establishment of the Records Management and Archives Office (RMAO), which was placed under the General Administrative Administration. Since 1998, it was placed under the National Commission for Culture and the Arts for purposes of policy coordination. On May 21, 2007, more than a century since its establishment, President Gloria Macapagal-Arroyo signed Republic Act 9470 that defined the various functions of the agency and formally renamed it to become the country's National Archives.

In 2004, then director Ricardo Manapat was accused of forging documents to support a disqualification case against presidential candidate Fernando Poe, Jr. Three staff members of the Archives testified in a Senate inquiry that the Director had ordered them to fabricate a birth certificate to indicate that Poe was not a natural-born Filipino citizen. Manapat was cleared of the charges by the Sandiganbayan (a special court in the Philippines) in 2005, but he had been on leave shortly before the Senate investigation started a year earlier.

On May 28, 2018, the building caught fire from a blaze that began at midnight nearby at the Land Management Bureau Building in Plaza Cervantes. Two people were injured, but none of the holdings from the archive were harmed.

== Organization and services ==
The National Archives conducts the National Inventory of Records and Archives and maintains the General Records Schedule of the Government. Aside from its Records Management and Reference Services, it provides Technical Assistance and Continuing Education services to the general public. The Archives is headed by an executive director, informally called the National Archivist of the Philippines. The current director is Victorino Manalo, appointed by President Benigno Aquino in 2012.

- Office of the Executive Director
- Office of the Deputy Executive Director
- Finance and Administrative Division
- Archives Preservation Division
- Archives Collection and Access Division
- Records Center Division
- Records Management Services Division
- Training and Information Division

The Archives is currently headquartered in the National Library of the Philippines and maintains offices and facilities in Paco, Manila, Cebu, and Davao.

== Collection ==
In the Archive's holdings are 13 million Spanish-era documents and another 60 million cataloged public documents. Some of the oldest records in the archive date back to the rule of the first Spanish Governor-General to the Philippines, Miguel López de Legazpi (1564–1572).

The holdings are divided into two major collections:

- Spanish Period Collection (1552–1900)
  - Documents
  - Plans
- American and Republic Period Collection (1900–Present)
  - Government Agencies
  - Civil Records
  - Notarial Documents
  - Japanese War Crime Records
  - Cattle Brands

Aside from the records of defunct government agencies, the National Archives also houses the records of colleges and universities closed by the Commission on Higher Education. Notably, the Archives does not keep a large portion of the Katipunan records, including the Philippine Declaration of Independence, which are currently kept by the National Library of the Philippines in its Philippine Insurgency Records collection. UNESCO has suggested for the nomination of important documents from the archives into the Memory of the World Register.
