= Pedro Paterno =

Prime Minister of the Philippines in 1899

His Excellency Pedro Alejandro Paterno
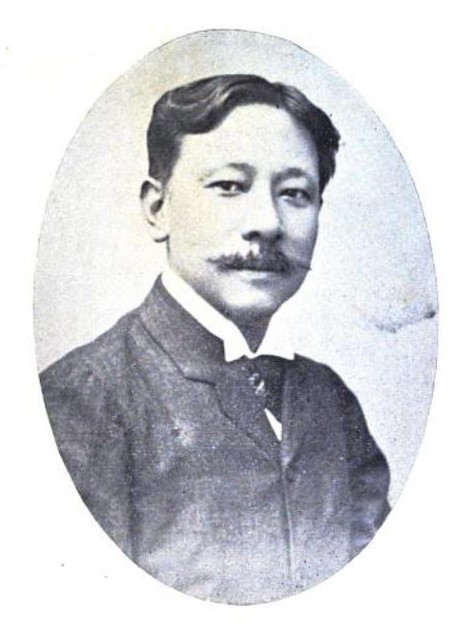
- Paterno as a member of the Philippine Assembly, 1908

2nd Prime Minister of the Philippines
- In office May 8, 1899 – November 13, 1899
- President: Emilio Aguinaldo
- Deputy: Trinidad Pardo de Tavera
- Preceded by: Apolinario Mabini
- Succeeded by: Position abolished (Next held by Ferdinand Marcos)

President of the Malolos Congress
- In office September 15, 1898 – November 13, 1899
- Vice President: Benito Legarda
- Preceded by: Position established
- Succeeded by: Position abolished (Sergio Osmeña as Speaker of the Philippine Assembly)

Member of the Philippine Assembly from La Laguna's 1st district
- In office October 16, 1907 – May 20, 1909
- Preceded by: District established
- Succeeded by: Potenciano Malvar

Member of the Malolos Congress from Ilocos Norte
- In office September 15, 1898 – November 13, 1899 Serving with Gregorio Aglipay, Primitivo Donato, Martin Garcia, José Luna, and Pio Romero

Personal details
- Born: Pedro Alejandro Paterno y de Vera-Ignacio; February 27, 1857 Quiapo, Manila, Captaincy General of the Philippines, Spanish Empire
- Died: March 26, 1911 (aged 54) Manila, Philippine Islands
- Resting place: Manila North Cemetery
- Party: Nacionalista (1907–1911)
- Other political affiliations: Federalista (1900–1907)
- Spouse: Luisa Piñeyro y Merino (m. 1890; died 1897)
- Education: Ateneo Municipal de Manila (BA); University of Salamanca; Central Madrid University (DCL, JCD)
- Occupation: Politician
- Profession: Poet, novelist

Pedro Alejandro Paterno y de Vera-Ignacio (Note: Also spelled Pedro Alejandro Paterno y Debera Ignacio.) (February 27, 1857 – March 26, 1911) was a Filipino revolutionary, politician, poet, and novelist who became the second Prime Minister of the Philippines and the sole president of the Malolos Congress during the First Philippine Republic.

His intervention on behalf of the Spanish led to the signing of the Pact of Biak-na-Bato on December 14, 1897, an account of which he published in 1910. Among his other works include the first novel written by a native Filipino, Ninay (1885), and the first Filipino collection of poems in Spanish, Sampaguitas y otras poesías varias ("Jasmines and Other Various Poems"), published in Madrid in 1880.

== Early life and career ==
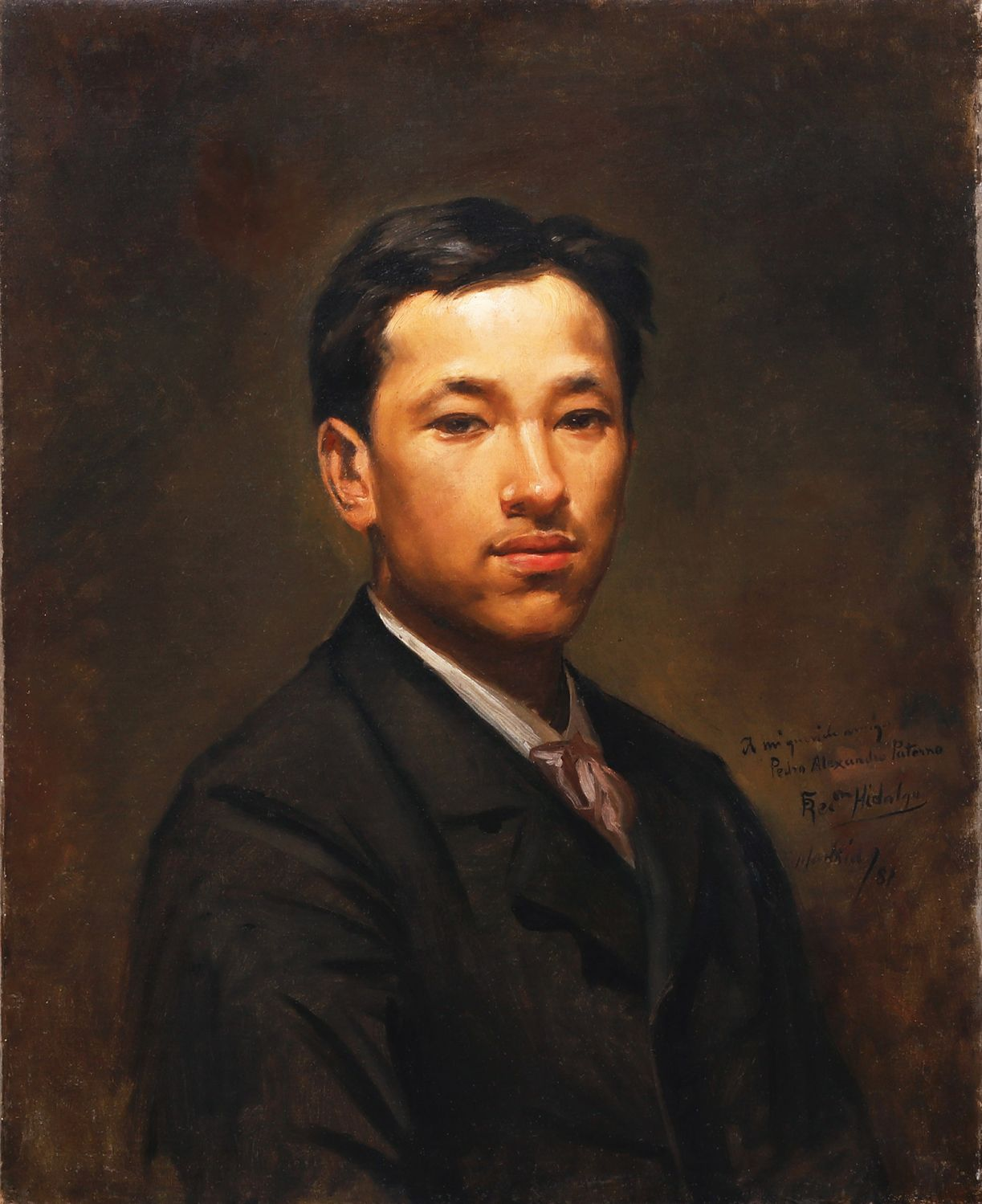
Portrait of Paterno by Félix Resurrección Hidalgo (1881)

Paterno was born on February 27, 1857 in Quiapo, Manila. He was a "child of privilege in a society of limited opportunities." He was one of 13 children born to Máximo Molo-Agustín-Paterno e Yamzon, a mestizo sangley born to a mestizo sangley father and a china cristiana mother, and his second wife, Carmen de Vera-Ignacio y Pineda, a mestiza mostly of lowland Tagalog descent. He was baptized on March 1, 1857 at Quiapo Church by Agustín de Mendoza, with his uncle Tomás Molo, who was a priest, as his godfather.

His father Máximo was exiled to Guam (then also part of the Spanish East Indies) for ten years following the 1872 Cavite mutiny, and died on July 26, 1900, leaving behind considerable wealth from his lucrative business ventures.

Paterno finished Bachiller en Artes at Ateneo Municipal de Manila. At the age of 14, he was sent to study in Spain, where he spent the next 11 years at the University of Salamanca where he took courses in Philosophy and Theology, and then the Central University of Madrid, where he graduated Doctor of Civil and Canon Law in 1880.

In 1876, he wrote his first opus entitled Influencia Social del Cristianismo wherein it shows how he consciously located himself in the metropolitan stream of Spanish Culture. It also unveiled the major themes of Paterno's works to come: law of social evolution, value of reason, human perfectibility, and a synthesis of an essentialised "Orient" and "Occident" in Christianity.

In 1893, he was awarded the Order of Isabella the Catholic. In March 1894, he was appointed as the Director of Museo Biblioteca de Filipinas (now National Library of the Philippines); he was the first Filipino to hold that position.

== Biak-na-Bato ==
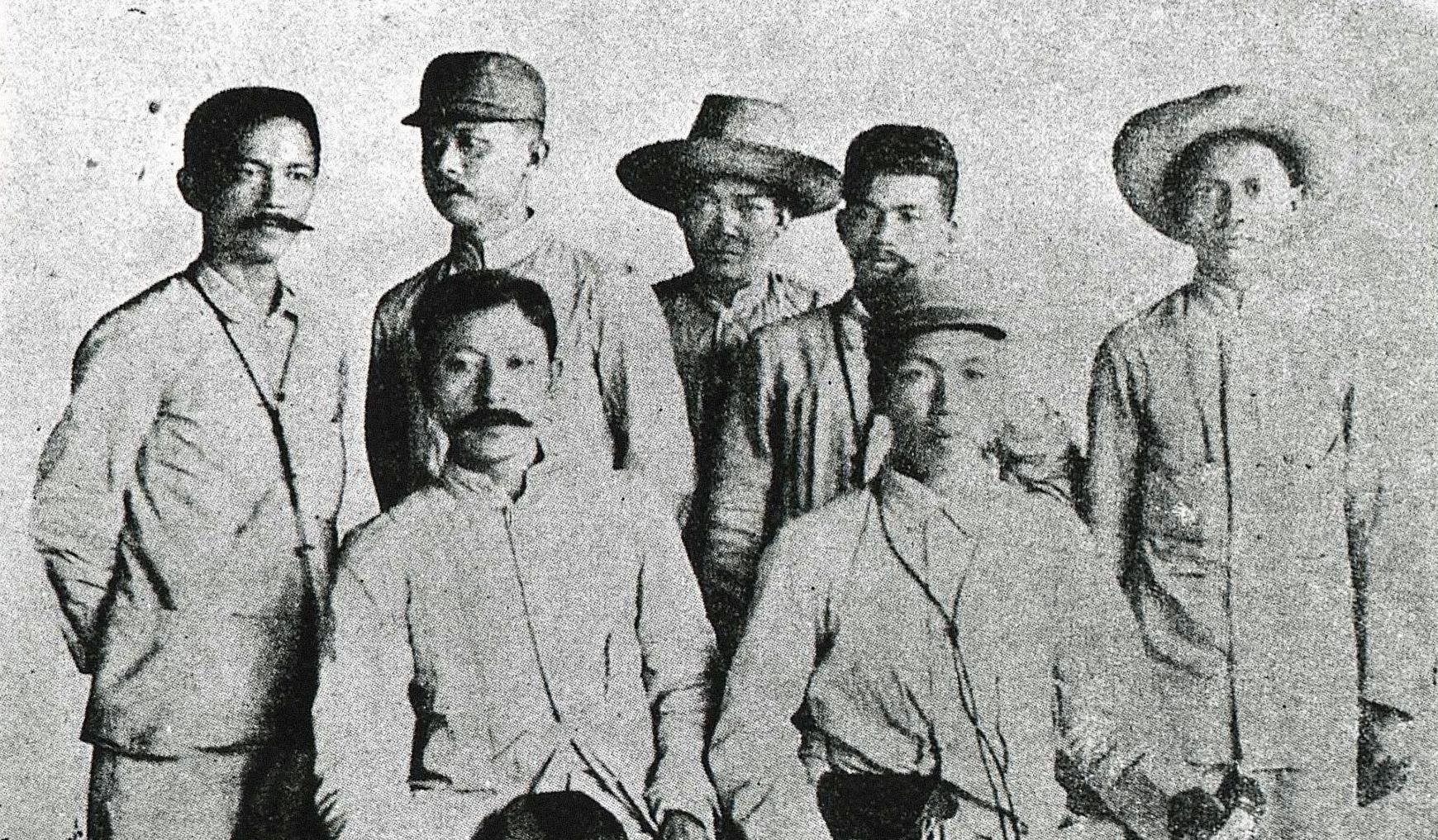
The Filipino negotiators for the Pact of Biak-na-Bato. Seated from left to right: Paterno and Emilio Aguinaldo with five companions.

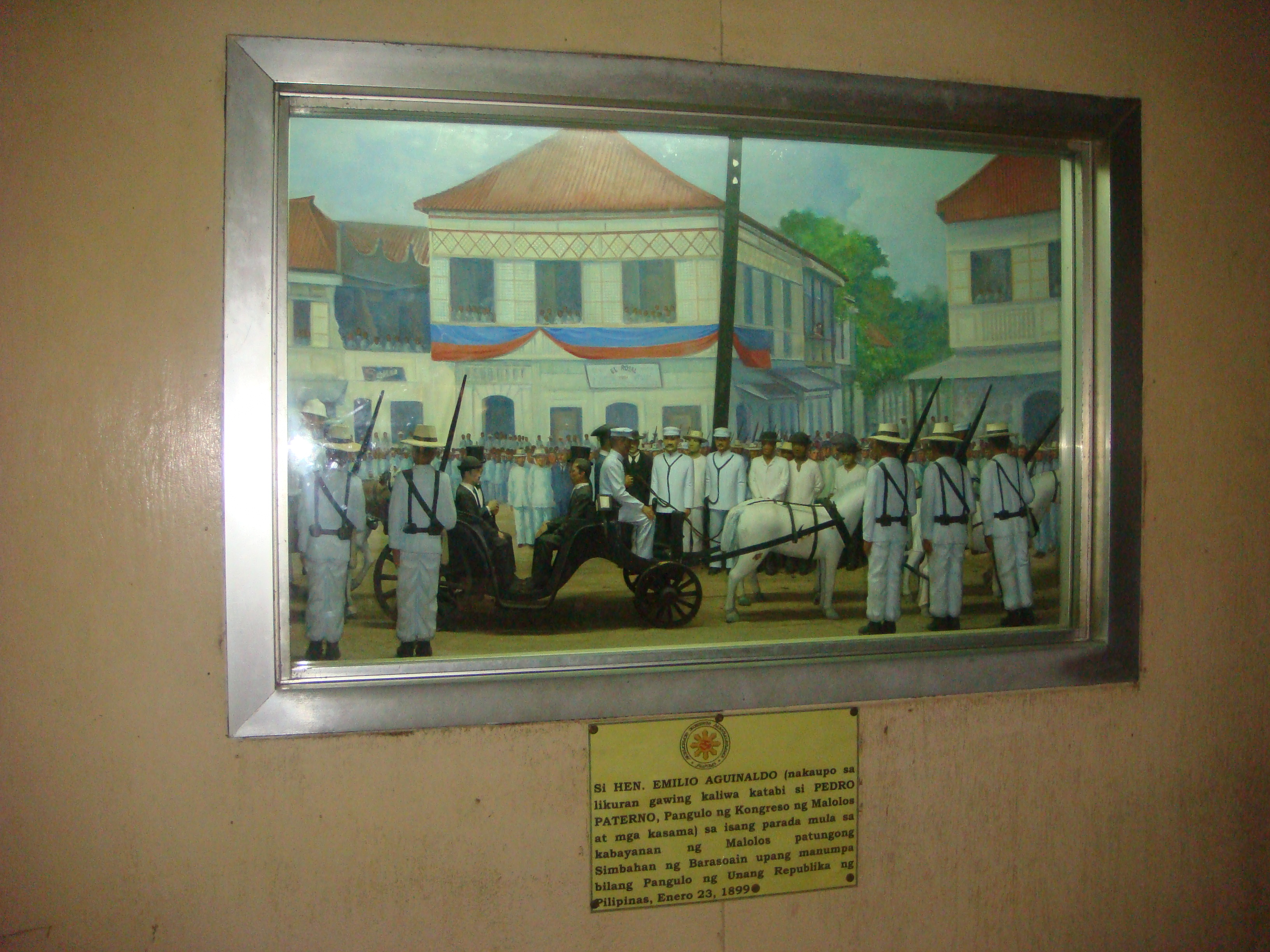
Emilio Aguinaldo and Pedro A. Paterno miniature model at Barasoain Church (in the horse carriage-parade for Aguinaldo's oath-taking as Philippine President on January 23, 1899).

At the trial of José Rizal in 1896, it was suggested that Paterno, along with Rizal, had incited the Katipunan because they had both written about pre-Spanish Philippine history. As evidence for their complicity, the Spanish prosecution cited Paterno's earlier work Antigua Civilización as promoting ideas which had "consequences both erroneous and injurious to Spanish sovereignty". Nobody moved against Paterno, however, because he was close to a significant number of Spanish officials, both military and civilian, who could vouch and cover for him. Thus, Paterno, like many others of the Manila elite, distanced himself from the events of the Katipunan revolution.

In 1897, the Philippine revolutionary forces led by General Emilio Aguinaldo had been driven out of Cavite and retreated northwards from town to town until they finally settled in the village of Biak-na-Bato, in the town of San Miguel de Mayumo in Bulacan. Here, they established what became known as the Republic of Biak-na-Bato which was an unrecognised secessionist microstate.

In late July 1897, Paterno presented himself to Governor-General Fernando Primo de Rivera, whom he had known while living in Spain, and offered his services as a mediator. Because many highly placed Spaniards of the time thought Paterno held great sway over the natives, Primo de Rivera accepted Paterno's offer. He called for a truce, explaining his decision to the Cortes Generales: "I can take Biak-na-Bato, any military man can take it, but I can not answer that I should crush the rebellion."

Paterno left Manila on August 4, 1897, and found Aguinaldo five days later. This began a three-month-long series of talks which saw Paterno constantly traveling between Manila, Biak-na-Bato, and some areas in Southern Luzon where a number of revolutionary chiefs held sway. During the negotiations, Paterno's wife Luisa died on November 27, 1897. In ceremonies from December 14 to 15 that year, Aguinaldo signed the Pact of Biak-na-Bato. He later proclaimed the official end of the Philippine Revolution on Christmas Day and left for Hong Kong via the port of Dagupan on December 27.

Paterno returned to Manila on January 11, 1898, amidst great celebration, but was spurned by Primo de Rivera and other authorities when he asked to be recompensed by being granted a dukedom with grandee, a seat in the Spanish Senate, and payment for his services in Mexican dollars. Because he was dismissed by the Spanish authorities, he instead wormed his way to power within the Revolutionary circles.

== Prime minister ==
Paterno was elected a delegate from Ilocos Norte and President of the Malolos Congress in September 1898. He served as prime minister of the First Philippine Republic in the middle of 1899, and served as head of the country's assembly, and the cabinet. Paterno was captured by the Americans in April 1900 in Antomoc, Benguet.

== American colonial period ==
Funeral of Pedro Paterno

With the Philippine–American War after the signing of the Treaty of Paris in 1898, he was among the most prominent Filipinos who joined the American side and advocated the incorporation of the Philippines into the United States. As the editor and proprietor of the newspaper La Patria, he supported American dominion and gratitude towards Spain, from whence "the Filipinos derived their civilization." Paterno was elected to the Philippine Assembly in 1907, representing the province of La Laguna's (present-day Laguna) 1st district in the 1st Philippine Legislature. He would serve until his term expired in 1909.

He died of cholera on March 26, 1911 at his home in Manila. He was laid to rest later that day at the Manila North Cemetery.

== Legacy and notoriety ==
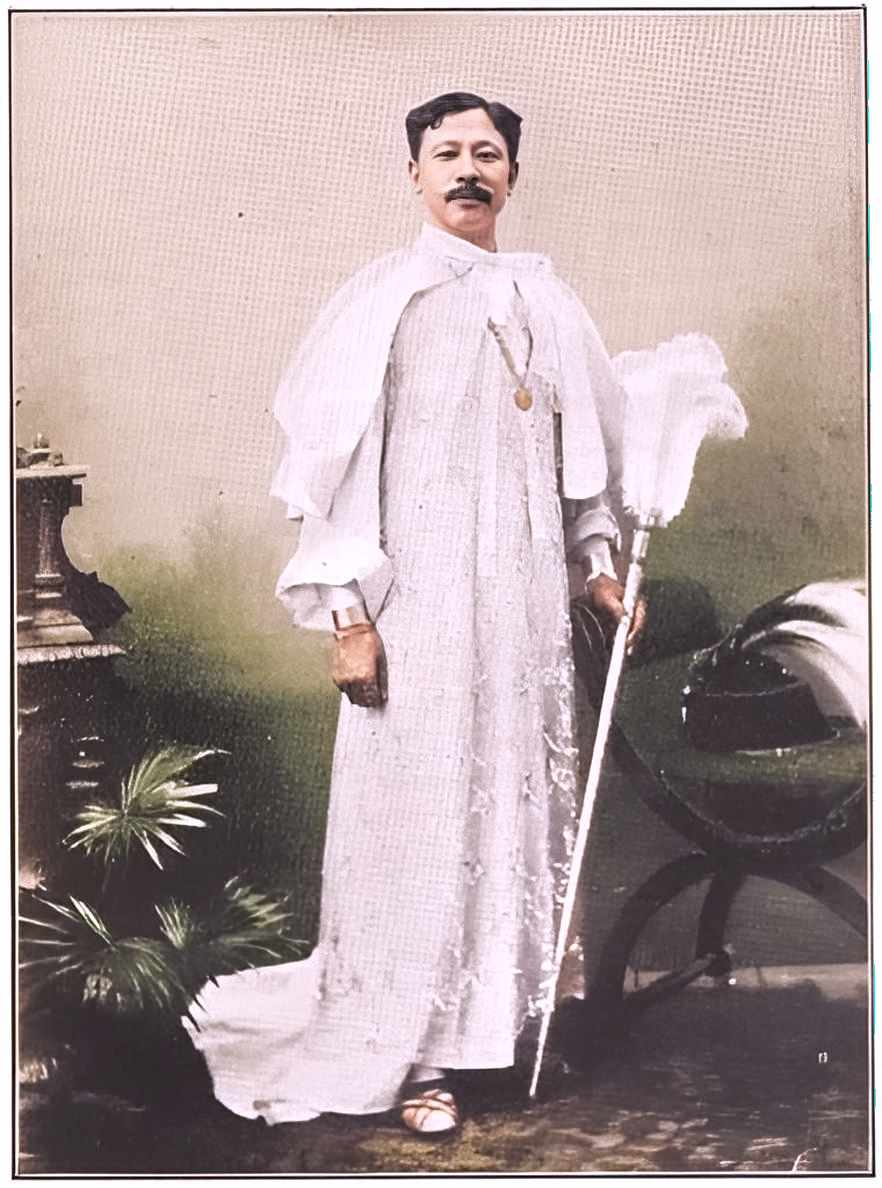
Paterno in regalia attire.

Despite Paterno's prominence in the many upheavals that defined the birth of the Philippine nation during his lifetime, Paterno's legacy is largely infamous among Philippine historians and nationalists.

Philippine historian Resil Mojares notes that:

History has not been kind to Pedro Paterno. A century ago, he was one of the country's premier intellectuals, blazing trails in Philippine letters. Today he is ignored in many of the fields in which he once held forth with much eminence, real and imagined. No full length biography or extended review of his corpus of writings has been written, and no one reads him today.

Mojares also indicated that his sarcastic and flamboyant attitude, wherein he seeks a high regard in the social hierarchy wherever he goes, invited the criticisms he received.

John Schumacher dismissed Paterno's works as "scholarly" in nature. He remarked that:

Paterno's "eccentric and ingenious elucubrations" on Philippine civilization undermined the national cause. "Reconstructing a Filipino past, however glorious in appearance, on false pretences can do nothing to build a sense of national identity, much less offer guidance for the present or the future."

Much of this is attributed to Paterno's penchant for turncoatism, as described by historian Ambeth Ocampo, who sums up his career thus:

Remember, Paterno was one of the greatest "balimbing" (turncoat) in history (perhaps he was the original "balimbing" in Philippine political history). He was first on the Spanish side, then when the declaration of independence was made in 1898, he "wormed his way to power" and became president of the Malolos Congress in 1899, then sensing the change in political winds after the establishment of the American colonial government, he became a member of the First Philippine Assembly.

== List of works ==
- Influencia Social del Cristianismo, 1876 pamphlet
- Sampaguitas y otras poesías varias, 1880 anthology of poems
- Ninay, 1885 novel
- Magdapio, 1903 four-part opera
- Aurora social, 1910–11 collection of novellas
- Los ultimos romanticos: en la erupción del Volcán de Taal, 1911

== Media portrayals ==
- Portrayed by Yul Servo in the film, El Presidente (2012).
- Portrayed by Leo Martinez in the film, Heneral Luna (2015), and its sequel, Goyo: Ang Batang Heneral (2018).
- Portrayed by JV Ibesate in the hit musical of Tanghalang Pilipino, Mabining Mandirigma.

== See also ==
- Dolores Paterno

== Notes ==
Political offices
Preceded by Apolinario Mabini	Prime Minister of the Philippines; 1899–1901	Vacant Position abolished Title next held by Ferdinand Marcos
New title	— TITULAR — Prime Minister of the Philippines; 1899 - April 1, 1901	Succeeded by Jorge B. Vargas (Ministries involved)
