= Ivan Henares =

Filipino conservationist and politician

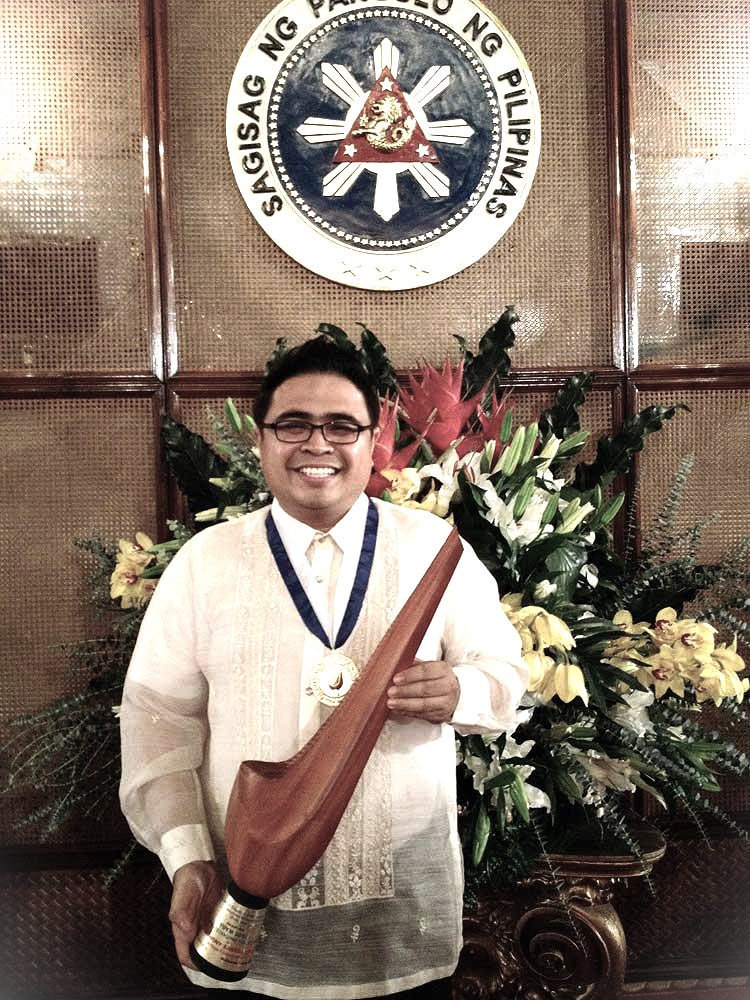
- Henares in 2012
- Born: Ivan Anthony Santos Henares; July 6, 1979 (age 47)
- Occupation: Cultural Commissioner
- Title: PhD
- Awards: The Outstanding Young Men (TOYM); Asia 21 Young Leaders

Academic background
- Education: University of the Philippines, Diliman Purdue University (Fulbright-CHED Scholar) Global Leaders Institute
- Website: ivanhenares.com

Ivan Anthony Santos Henares (born July 6, 1979) is a Filipino conservation advocate, tourism educator, and heritage expert. He serves as Secretary-General of the UNESCO National Commission of the Philippines and Commissioner of the National Commission for Culture and the Arts (NCCA).

== Education ==
Henares holds a Bachelor of Arts in Economics, Master of Business Administration, and Diploma in Urban and Regional Planning from the University of the Philippines Diliman. He earned his PhD in Hospitality and Tourism Management and a Graduate Certificate in Environmental Policy from Purdue University in 2021,. In 2023, he completed an Executive Graduate Certificate in Arts Innovation from the Global Leaders Institute based in Washington, DC.

== Heritage advocacy ==
Ivan Henares began his early work in heritage conservation in San Fernando, Pampanga where he initiated the "Preserving Heritage for Progress Program" in 2001. He became a member of the Board of Trustees of the Heritage Conservation Society in 2006, where he served as Vice President and President, and is currently Chairperson. Currently, Henares sits in the Board of Commissioners of the NCCA as head of the Subcommission on Cultural Heritage. Henares held other key roles in cultural organizations; such as Chairperson of the Southeast Asian Cultural Heritage Alliance, and President of the International Cultural Tourism Committee (ICTC) of the International Council on Monuments and Sites (ICOMOS).
