= Sentro Rizal =

Philippine cultural organization

Coordinates: 14°35′18.41″N 120°58′32.40″E

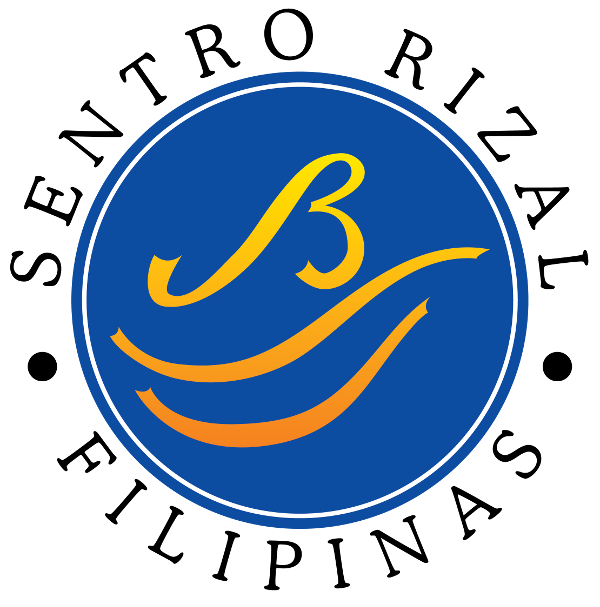

Cultural center overview
- Formed: 2009
- Headquarters: NCCA Building, 633 General Luna Street, Intramuros, Manila
- Parent Cultural center: Office of the President of the Philippines via National Commission for Culture and the Arts
- Website: sentrorizal.ncca.gov.ph

The Sentro Rizal (transl. Rizal Center) is a Philippine government-sponsored organization whose main objective is the global promotion of Filipino art, culture, and language. Established by virtue of the National Cultural Heritage Act of 2009, its headquarters is located at the National Commission for Culture and the Arts (NCCA) office in Intramuros, Manila. Sentro Rizal aims to promote Philippine arts, culture, and language throughout the world through the establishment of Philippine centers in various countries which initiate and organize cultural training programs and activities for overseas Filipinos.

Sentro Rizal is named after José Rizal, the Philippines' acclaimed national hero, writer, and polymath. His works Noli Me Tángere and El Filibusterismo are acknowledged to have sparked the country's quest for independence in 1898. He championed love of family and country, peace, freedom, human dignity, knowledge, use of local language, bravery, women's role in nation building, unity, compassion, productive involvement of the youth, among others.

== Logo ==
The official logo of the Sentro Rizal is composed of two elements, the balangay and baybayin which are both significant to Filipino heritage. The letters "S" and "R" are rendered in the ancient Filipino syllabic script known as baybayin and are stylized to form a balangay, an ancient Philippine edged-pegged plank boat, reflecting the maritime heritage of the Philippines and depicting the character of Filipino migrants. The balangay also represents the quest of individuals in exploring the real essence of Filipino identity through culture and arts.

The Sentro Rizal acts as the balangay which provides overseas Filipinos and their children the means to connect to their roots – instilling a strong sense of nationhood and pride among them in being Filipinos.

The color of the Sentro Rizal logo was patterned from NCCA's logo – blue and gold.

== Cultural centers ==
As of September 2020, there are 35 Sentros Rizal in the following locations:

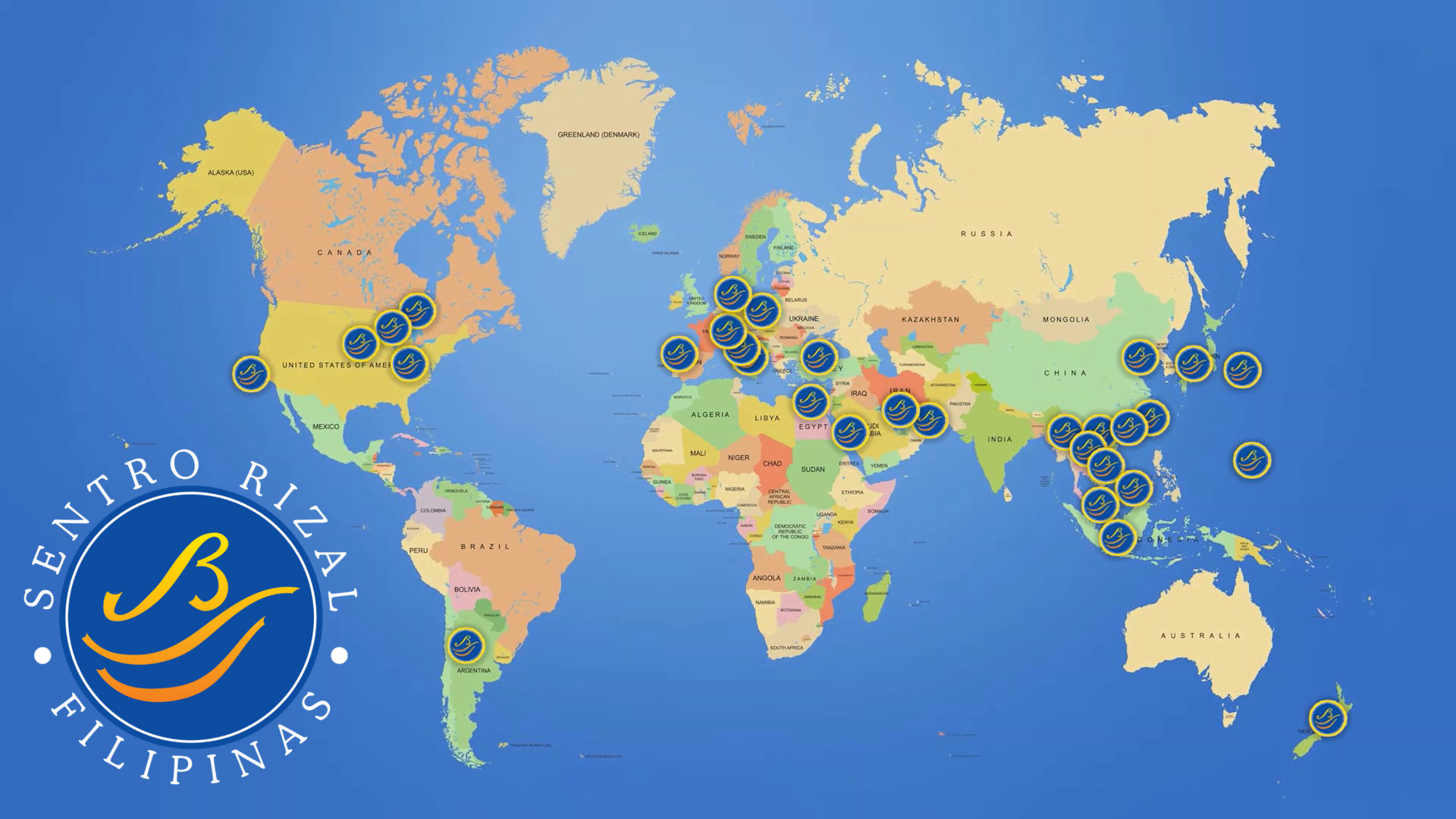
Map of Sentro Rizal Centers

Sentro Rizal Centers (as of September 2020)
	Country	City		Country	City
A	Argentina	Buenos Aires	N	New Zealand	Wellington
A	Australia	Sydney	O	Oman	Muscat
B	Bahrain	Manama	Q	Qatar	Doha
B	Brunei	Bandar Seri Begawan	S	Saudi Arabia	Jeddah
C	Cambodia	Phnom Penh	S	Singapore	Singapore
C	Canada	Ottawa	S	South Korea	Seoul
C	Canada	Toronto	S	Spain	Madrid
C	China	Beijing	S	Switzerland	Berne
C	China	Hong Kong	T	Thailand	Bangkok
C	China	Xiamen	T	Turkey	Ankara
E	Egypt	Cairo	U	United Arab Emirates	Abu Dhabi
G	Germany	Berlin	U	United Kingdom	London
I	Indonesia	Jakarta	U	United States of America	Hagåtña
I	Italy	Milan	U	United States of America	Los Angeles
I	Italy	Rome	U	United States of America	San Francisco
J	Japan	Tokyo	U	United States of America	Washington, D.C.
L	Laos	Vientiane			
M	Myanmar	Yangon			

=== Activities and programs ===
In 2015, the first Filipino language pilot class was conducted in Phnom Penh, Cambodia. Twenty-four students completed the first beginner's level language class, dubbed "Masayang Matuto ng Filipino".

The Commission on Filipinos Overseas has made use of digital media in disseminating Filipiniana for overseas Filipinos, called the "Virtual Sentro Rizal". This Filipiniana collection consists of 250 gigabytes of data including 72 hours of video of Filipino cultural materials covering different genres across regions.

== See also ==
- Alliance française
- Asian Cultural Council
- British Council
- Confucius Institute
- Dante Alighieri Society
- Goethe-Institut
- Instituto Cervantes
- Japan Foundation
- Korean Cultural Centers
  - King Sejong Institute
- Taiwan Academy
