= Ricardo Manapat =

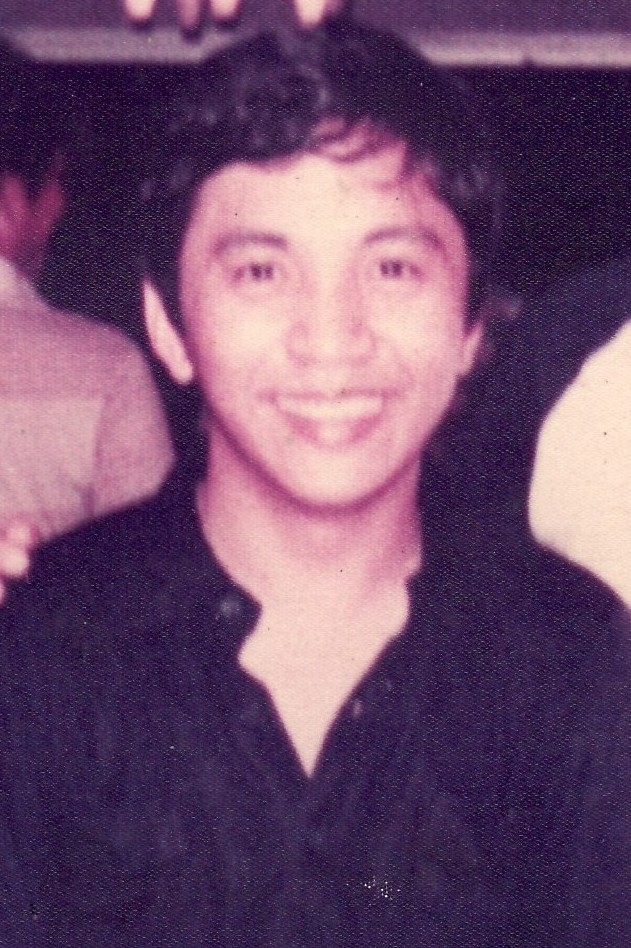
- Manapat in 1979
- Born: Jose Ricardo de Leon Manapat; May 24, 1953; Manila, Philippines
- Died: December 24, 2008 (aged 55); Antipolo, Rizal, Philippines
- Education: Ateneo de Manila University (elementary to postgraduate); University of the Philippines (MA); La Trobe University (PhD)
- Occupations: Activist; scholar; writer; researcher; educator

Jose Ricardo de Leon Manapat (May 24, 1953 – December 24, 2008) was an activist, scholar, writer, researcher, and educator who was the Director of the Records Management and Archives Office of the Philippines (The National Archives) from 1996 to 1998 and 2002 to 2008. He is best known as the author of the book, "Some Are Smarter Than Others: The History of Marcos' Crony Capitalism", a work on anti-cronyism exposing the wealth of the Marcos dynasty, and as Editor-in-Chief of the "Smart File", Smart File Magazine Animal Farm Series.

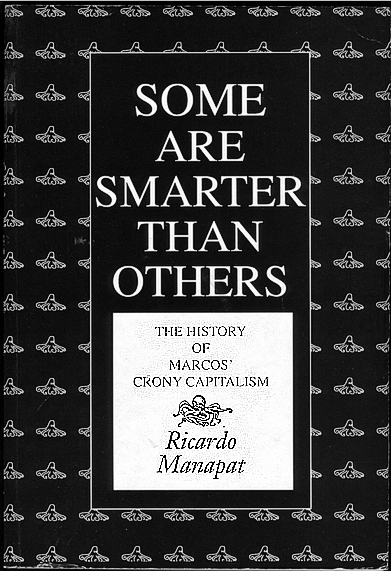
Manapat's Book

== Early life and education ==
Ricardo Manapat was born on May 24, 1953, in Manila, Philippines. His father, Apolinario B. Manapat (1925–2006), was a mechanical engineer, and his mother, Angelita de Leon (b. 1923), is a pharmacist and was a Professor of Chemistry at the University of Santo Tomas for 30 years. Manapat was the eldest of five children, and his siblings are Maria Teresa, Maria Lourdes, Maria Cristina, and Jose Alfredo.

As a young child, Manapat served as an acolyte at the Santo Domingo Church in Quezon City, when Mass was still given in Latin. He played piano and violin, and also studied the clarinet and trumpet. He was an avid and voracious reader, and he kept music and books as part of his daily life. He completed his elementary, high school, college, and post-graduate studies at the Ateneo de Manila University, where he cultivated and pursued his interests in mathematics, physics, linguistics, history, economics, and philosophy. He was fluent in English, Spanish and Filipino, and spoke German, French, and Italian. He also studied Latin, Portuguese, Arabic, Catalan, and Sanskrit in his later years.

In his high school days, Manapat wanted to serve his country, and in response to the Marcos dictatorship, he joined Kasapi (Kapulungan ng mga Sandigan ng Pilipinas) and postponed his studies at the Ateneo for a year and became very active in the movement. He resumed his high school studies at the Ateneo de Manila, and obtained his college degree in Philosophy in 1976, graduating with Departmental Honors.

Manapat was pursuing a doctorate in Economics at the New School for Social Research in New York, when he decided to return to the Philippines after the People Power movement led by President Corazon Aquino in 1986. He completed a master's degree in Spanish at the University of the Philippines, while pursuing master's degrees in Mathematics and History at the Ateneo de Manila University. In 2005, he began his studies in Historical Sociology towards a doctoral degree at La Trobe University in Australia. He was the recipient of a Commonwealth International Student Scholarship and was awarded the DM Myer Medal as the most outstanding undergraduate student graduating in that Faculty in 2006.

== Career ==
After graduating with honors, Manapat became an instructor at the Department of Philosophy in the Ateneo de Manila University from 1977 to 1979. In December 1979, he met with Sen. Benigno Aquino Jr. ("Ninoy") at the Aquino residence in Quezon City, where Manapat was congratulated by Aquino for his then 48-page pamphlet, “Some are Smarter than Others”. Aquino, while incarcerated in Fort Bonifacio in 1979, called the document as “the most explosive document to have rocked the city of Manila”. The meeting in Quezon City proved to be the beginning of a lifelong friendship between the two. A year later, Manapat received a letter from Aquino asking him to develop his pamphlet into a book. Manapat started working on the book in the United States in 1980.

Manapat worked at Bear Stearns, a global investment banking and securities firm in New York City, in 1988. While in the United States, Manapat also took computer programming courses at New York University and briefly taught at St. Peter's College in New Jersey.

Manapat then completed his book, “Some are Smarter than Others: The History of Marcos’ Crony Capitalism”, in 1991. The book takes its title from a statement made by Imelda Marcos on criticisms regarding her relatives who became overnight millionaires under the Marcos regime. Imelda Marcos reportedly said, “Sometimes you have smart relatives who can make it …. My dear, there are always people who are just a little faster, more brilliant, more aggressive.” Manapat’s book became the best-selling book in contemporary Philippine history at that time.

In 1996–1998 and 2002–2008, Manapat was Director of the Records Management and Archives Office of the Philippines (The National Archives). He was first appointed by President Fidel V. Ramos in 1996, and then by President Gloria Macapagal Arroyo in 2002. As Director of The National Archives, Manapat oversaw the reconstruction of the Intendencia, the historic building in Intramuros erected in 1824, as the future home of the National Archives. His work included the prior historical and architectural researches, the construction phase, and the soft-inauguration of the building in 1988. Manapat started the project to digitize all the important historical document holdings of the National Archives, storing them in computer media in order to preserve them and make them more accessible to the public. During his directorship, Manapat was able to finish around a third of the 12 million documents in the holdings by 1998. Manapat also initiated the cataloging of the historical documents, resulting in the discovery of rare Rizaliana in 1998.

In 1998, Manapat also achieved the highest score (92.7%) in Civil Service Career Executive Service exams.

In January 2004, three National Archives staff members accused Manapat of forging documents against the late Presidential candidate, Fernando Poe, Jr. Manapat, however, was cleared of the charges by the Sandiganbayan (a special court in the Philippines). Manapat then went on leave from the National Archives to pursue a doctoral degree in Historical Sociology at La Trobe University in Australia. He returned to the Philippines in 2008 to research and write his thesis, and to continue his various projects and studies. He completed his Master’s degree in Spanish on Rizal Studies at the University of the Philippines, and was working on his thesis for his Master’s in History and Mathematics at the Ateneo de Manila University.

== Death ==
Manapat died unexpectedly in his home in Antipolo, Philippines, on December 24, 2008, at age 55. An autopsy revealed the cause of death to be myocardial infarction.

== Sources ==
- Jose Ricardo L. Manapat Curriculum Vitae
- Jose Ricardo Manapat. Some are Smarter Than Others: A History of Marcos'Crony Capitalism. Aletheia Publications, New York. 1991. ISBN 971-91287-0-4.
- Ricardo Manapat, former National Archives chief, dies. ABS-CBN News, December 25, 2008.
- Sun Star Manila. Manapat takes leave amid falsification raps. Sun Star, January 23, 2004.
- Philippine Daily Inquirer. "Manapat, Ex-Archive Chief, Dies". Inquirer.net, December 26, 2008. Retrieved 10/24/2009: http://services.inquirer.net/print/print.php?article_id=20081226-180016
- Maglalang, Ferdie. GMA Names New Archives Chief. Manila Bulletin, January 23, 2004.
