= National Commission for Culture and the Arts =

Philippine government agency for culture organization

Coordinates: 14°35′18.41″N 120°58′32.40″E

- Pambansang Komisyon para sa Kultura at mga Sining (Filipino)

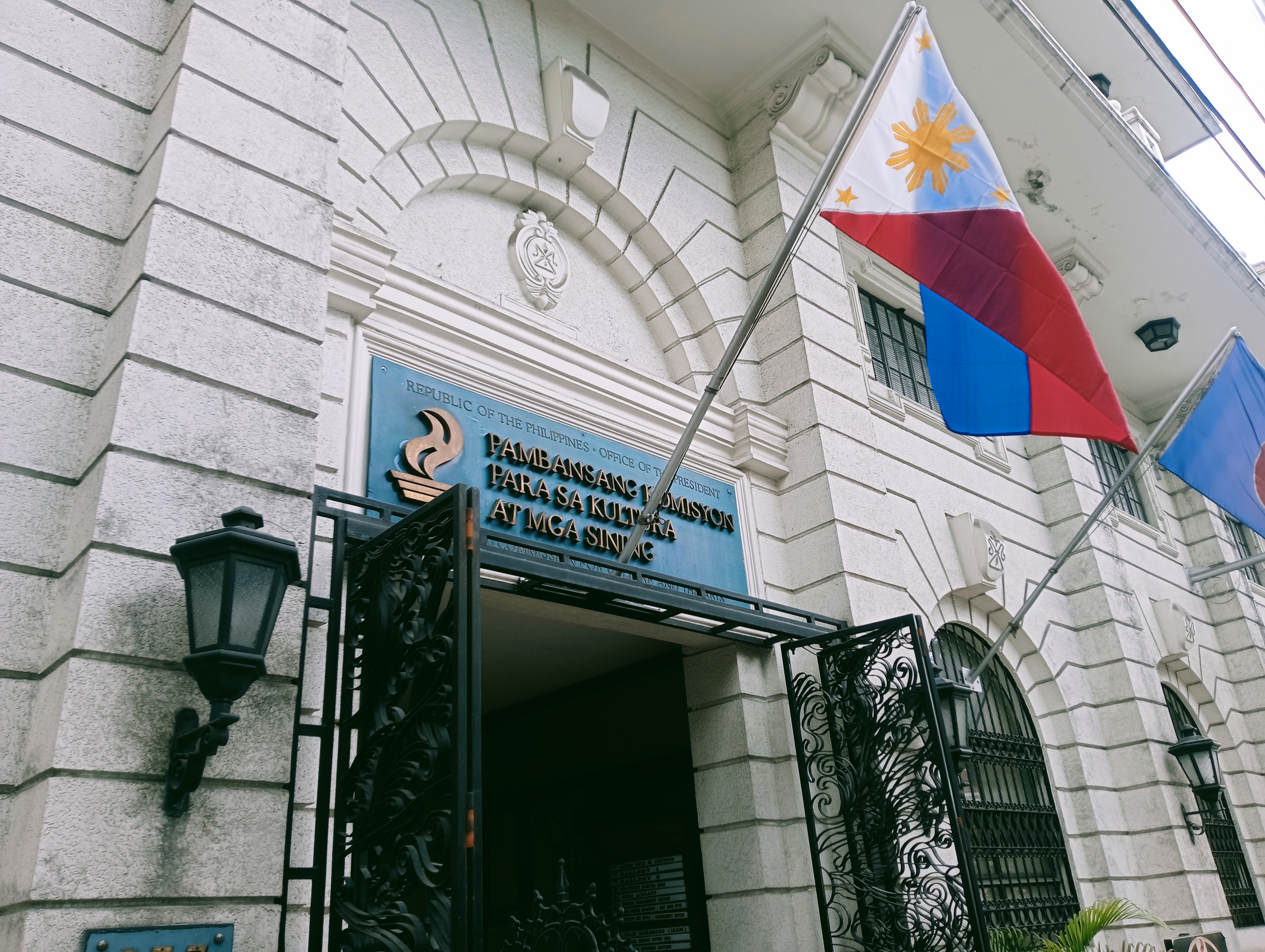
- Façade of the institution

Commission overview
- Formed: April 3, 1992; 34 years ago
- Preceding agencies: National Commission on Culture; Presidential Commission on Culture and the Arts
- Type: Arts council, regulatory commission, government agency
- Jurisdiction: Philippine arts and cultural development
- Headquarters: NCCA Building, 633 General Luna Street, Intramuros, Manila
- Employees: 42 (2024)
- Annual budget: 30 million (GAA)
- Commission executive: Eric Babar Zerrudo, Chairman and Executive Director
- Parent department: Office of the President of the Philippines
- Child agencies: National Archives of the Philippines; National Library of the Philippines; National Museum of the Philippines; National Historical Commission of the Philippines; Commission on the Filipino Language; Cultural Center of the Philippines; Sentro Rizal
- Website: ncca.gov.ph

The National Commission for Culture and the Arts of the Philippines (NCCA; Filipino: Pambansang Komisyon para sa Kultura at mga Sining, Cebuano: Nasodnong Komisyon alang sa Budaya ug mga Arte) is the official government agency for culture in the Philippines. It is the overall policy making body, coordinating, and grants giving agency for the preservation, development and promotion of Philippine arts and culture; an executing agency for the policies it formulates; and task to administering the National Endowment Fund for Culture and the Arts (NEFCA) – fund exclusively for the implementation of culture and arts programs and projects.

== History ==
The successful overthrow of the dictatorship in 1987 through the People Power Revolution inspired the different sectors of society to rally behind the new government towards the restoration of democracy. On March 12, 1986, the Alliance of Artists for the Creation of a Ministry of Culture (AACMC) drafted and adopted a proposal for the establishment of a Ministry of Culture. The group cited the inability of the Ministry of Education, Culture, and Sports to devote time and attention to cultural planning due to the gargantuan task of addressing the problems of the educational system.

President Corazon Aquino responded by issuing Executive Order No. 118 on January 30, 1987 which established the Presidential Commission on Culture and the Arts (PCCA). It was a diminutive agency compared to the proposal of AACMC but the said order was cognizant of the existence of specialized cultural agencies and that these should only be placed under the umbrella of one agency to coordinate their efforts.

On April 3, 1992, under the new constitution, Congress enacted Republic Act No. 7356 which institutionalized the establishment of the National Commission for Culture and the Arts (NCCA) replacing PCCA. This said law mandated the formulation of national cultural policies and programs according to the following principles:

a) pluralistic, fostering deep respect for the cultural identity of each locality, region or ethno-linguistic locality, as well as elements assimilated from other cultures through the natural process of acculturation;
b) democratic, encouraging and supporting the participation of the vast masses of our people in its programs and projects;
c) non-partisan, open to all people and institution, regardless of creed, affiliation, ideology, ethnic origin, age, gender or class, with no organized group or sector having monopoly of its services; and
d) liberative, having concern for the decolonization and emancipation of the Filipino psyche in order to ensure the full flowering of Filipino culture.

The establishment of the NCCA prompted the cultural agencies that were attached to it, by virtue of the same law, to review its existing mandates and programs to harmonize the delivery of cultural services. CCP, for its part, transformed itself to become the national coordinating center for the performing arts. It also sought to remove its "elitist" image by strengthening its outreach programs and developing partnerships with local arts councils.

== Board of Commissioners ==
As governed by RA 7356, The National Commission for Culture and the Arts is governed by a Board of Commissioners composed of 15 members, namely:

- Loren Legarda (Chairperson, Senate Committee on Basic Education, Arts, and Culture)
- Roman Romulo (Chairperson, House Committee on Basic Education and Culture)
- Gina O. Gonong, Commissioner (Undersecretary for Curriculum and Teaching, Department of Education)
- Edwin R. Enrile, Commissioner (Undersecretary for Legal and Special Concerns, Department of Tourism)
- Arthur P. Casanova, Commissioner (Chairman, Komisyon sa Wikang Filipino)
- Emmanuel F. Calairo, Commissioner, (Chair, National Historical Commission of the Philippines)
- Jeremy R. Barns, Commissioner (Director IV, National Museum)
- Cesar Gilbert Q. Adriano, Commissioner (Director IV, The National Library of the Philippines)
- Victorino Mapa Manalo, Commissioner (Executive Director, National Archives of the Philippines)
- Dr. Ivan Anthony S. Henares, Commissioner (Head, Subcommission on Cultural Heritage)
- Dr. Arvin Villalon, Commissioner (Head, Subcommission on the Arts)
- Carlo Ebeo, Commissioner (Head, Subcommission on Cultural Dissemination)
- Reden Ulo, Commissioner (Head, Subcommission on Cultural Communities and Traditional Arts)
- Oscar G. Casaysay (Executive Director, National Commission for Culture and the Arts)

== Activities ==
It is also responsible for the annual celebration of:

- National Arts Month (February)
- UNESCO-ITI World Theatre Week (March 21–27)
- National Literature Month (April)
- National Dance Week (Fourth Week of April)
- National Heritage Month (May)
- Linggo ng Musikang Pilipino (Last Week of July)
- Indigenous Peoples Month (October)
- Museums and Galleries Month (October)
- Library and Information Services Month (November)

During Indigenous Peoples Month, the NCCA annually conducts the Dayaw festival. The festival brings together representatives of Indigenous communities from across the Philippines to celebrate and showcase their cultures, traditions and languages, while also promoting awareness of the rights and challenges faced by Indigenous peoples in the Philippines.

== Logo ==
The NCCA logo is the Alab ng Haraya (The Flame of Imagination), which symbolizes the spring of Filipino art and culture. It is composed of two basic elements – the fire and the censer. The fire is a stylized character "ka" of the Philippine indigenous script Baybayin, that stands for kadakilaan or greatness. The fire represents the highest level of imagination and emanates from a three-tiered censer. The three tiers stand for organization, economic support, and an orientation rooted on a thorough grasp of tradition and history, which the NCCA provides. It is done in gold to symbolize the immense wealth of Philippine culture.

== Agung ==
The agung is a knobbed, deep-rimmed metal gong prominently used by Mindanao ethnic groups in the Philippines and used in various communal rituals. Suspended in the air from a frame by rope or metal chains, the musical instrument which traces its roots in Indonesia is also employed by some indigenous groups as a means to announce community events, and as an indicator of the passage of time.

Agung, the official newsletter of the NCCA is published on a quarterly basis.

== Sentro Rizal ==
In celebration of the 150th birth anniversary of Jose Rizal, The National Commission for Culture and the Arts formally established the Philippines' first Sentro Rizal at the NCCA Building in Intramuros, Manila on June 28, 2011. Sentro Rizal was recognized by virtue of Section 42 of Republic Act 10066 known as the National Cultural Heritage Act of 2009, which specifies a center "whose main purpose is the promotion of Philippine arts, culture and language throughout the world."

Moreover, Section 43 of the same law, states that the SR "shall be a repository, inter alia, of materials on Philippine arts, culture and language: books, digital video discs, compact discs, films, magazines, artworks, tourism promotion materials, information materials, etc. that shall be made available to the public, both Filipino and foreign". SR shall also organize cultural programs and activities for Filipinos, especially for children overseas, to promote appreciation and understanding of Philippine culture and the arts.

Sentro Rizal aims to educate overseas Filipinos about the culture and arts of the Philippines. Since May 2016, 18 Sentro Rizal offices around the world have been established.

== Awards ==
The commission is responsible for bestowing significant awards reflecting Filipino culture and the arts. These awards are the Order ng Pambansang Alagad ng Sining (Order of National Artists), Gawad sa Manlilikha ng Bayan (National Living Treasures Award), Gawad Alab ng Haraya (Alab ng Haraya Awards), Dangal ng Haraya (Achievement Award), Ani ng Dangal (Harvest of Honors), the Philippine Heritage Awards, and the Pama-As Gintong Bai Award.

- Order ng Pambansang Alagad ng Sining (Order of National Artists) is the highest national recognition given to Filipino individuals who have made significant contributions to the development of Philippine arts; namely, Music, Dance, Theater, Visual Arts, Literature, Film, Broadcast Arts, and Architecture and Allied Arts. The order is jointly administered by the National Commission for Culture and the Arts (NCCA) and the Cultural Center of the Philippines (CCP) and conferred by the President of the Philippines upon recommendation by both institutions.
- Gawad sa Manlilikha ng Bayan (National Living Treasures Award) was institutionalized through Republic Act No. 7355. The NCCA, through the Gawad sa Manlilikha ng Bayan Committee and an Ad Hoc Panel of Experts, conducts the search for the finest traditional artists of the land, adopts a program that will ensure the transfer of their skills to others and undertakes measures to promote a genuine appreciation of and instill pride among the Philippine people about the genius of the Manlilikha ng Bayan.
- Gawad Alab ng Haraya (Alab ng Haraya Awards) honors outstanding achievements in the performing arts, cultural conservation, arts management, library and information services program, theater production, cultural journalism and documentation, and other fields.
- Dangal ng Haraya (Achievement Award) is given to living Filipino artists, cultural workers and historians; artistic or cultural groups, historical societies, institutions, foundations and councils, to recognize their outstanding achievements in relevant fields that have made an impact and significant contribution to Philippine culture and arts.
- Ani ng Dangal (Harvest of Honors) is a state recognition given by the National Commission for Culture and the Arts under the Office of the President of the Republic of the Philippines. It is an annual event in the Philippines celebrated as a highlight and concluding rite of the Philippine Arts Festival.
- Philippine Heritage Awards is an annual conservation recognition program under which monetary prizes, awards, and citations will be given by the President of the Philippines, upon the recommendation of the NCCA, for special achievements and important contributions and services in the area of heritage preservation and conservation efforts. This is pursuant to Section 37 of Republic Act No. 10066 or the National Cultural Heritage Act of 2009.
- Pama-As Gintong Bai Award was a commemorative award given to 31 women from various disciplines in 2005 to honor women aged 65 and above for their lifelong contributions to culture and the arts, in celebration of the "Centennial Year of the Feminist Movement of the Philippines."

== Department of Culture ==
In 2016, the National Commission for Culture and the Arts and its partners in Congress have announced that they will seek to establish a Department of Culture. However, political factors hindered its initial pace. In January 2017, the filing of a bill which seeks to formally establish a holistic Department of Culture was completed. The bill is a priority legislation, which was expected to pass into law in early 2019. The Secretary of the proposed Department of Culture should be an expert in the field of culture and the arts, according to the bill. If the bill passes into law, the Department of Culture will be the only department in government where the head should possess the expertise of the field as a qualification for the job.

The creation of the culture department is backed by the country's science and technology department. The Senate version of the bill is being pushed by senators Escudero, Angara, Aquino, Binay, Ejercito, Gatchalian, Hontiveros, Legarda, Villanueva, and Zubiri – with no senators expressing dissent. The House version of the bill is being pushed by representatives Escudero and De Venecia – with one representative expressing dissent (Atienza).

The bureaus that will be established under the department are the following: Bureau of Cultural Communities and Traditional Arts Development, Bureau of Cultural Properties Protection and Regulation, Bureau of Cultural Properties Preservation, Bureau of Artistic Resources Development, Bureau of Cultural Research, Education, and Dissemination; and Bureau of Cultural and Creative Industries.

The bill also establishes three national institutes on culture, namely, National Institute of Living Traditions, which would form programs to safeguard, sustain and propagate cultural heritage, particularly for indigenous communities, National Institute of Cultural Heritage Preservation, which would form programs and projects in conservation arts, sciences, trades with focus on the preservation of cultural property and vocational training for the youth, and National Institute of Culture and Arts Management, which would form programs related to the education, training, and certification of cultural officers. The current Sentro Rizal program of the NCCA is upheld and retained in the bill.

Under the proposed bill, the following cultural agencies will be under the department: Cultural Center of the Philippines, National Museum of the Philippines, National Historical Commission of the Philippines, National Library of the Philippines, National Archives of the Philippines, Komisyon ng Wikang Filipino, Intramuros Administration, National Parks Development Committee, Nayong Filipino Foundation, Film Development Council of the Philippines, National Book Development Board, and Design Center of the Philippines. However, the Department of Tourism has expressed their 'wish' to retain Intramuros Administration, National Parks Development Committee, and Nayong Filipino Foundation, while the Department of Trade and Industry expressed its 'wish' to retain the Design Center of the Philippines.

== See also ==
- Ancestral houses of the Philippines
- Arts of the Philippines
- Culture of the Philippines
- Historical markers of the Philippines
- Important Cultural Property (Philippines)
- Intangible Cultural Heritage of the Philippines
- Lists of Cultural Properties of the Philippines
- List of Memory of the World (Documentary) Heritage of the Philippines
- List of National Artists of the Philippines
- List of National Cultural Treasures in the Philippines
- List of National Living Treasures (Gawad ng Manlilika) of the Philippines
- List of World Heritage Sites in the Philippines
- National Cultural Heritage Act
- Pama-As Gintong Bai Award
- Tourism in the Philippines
- Schools of Living Traditions
