= Schools of Living Traditions =

Schools in the Philippines

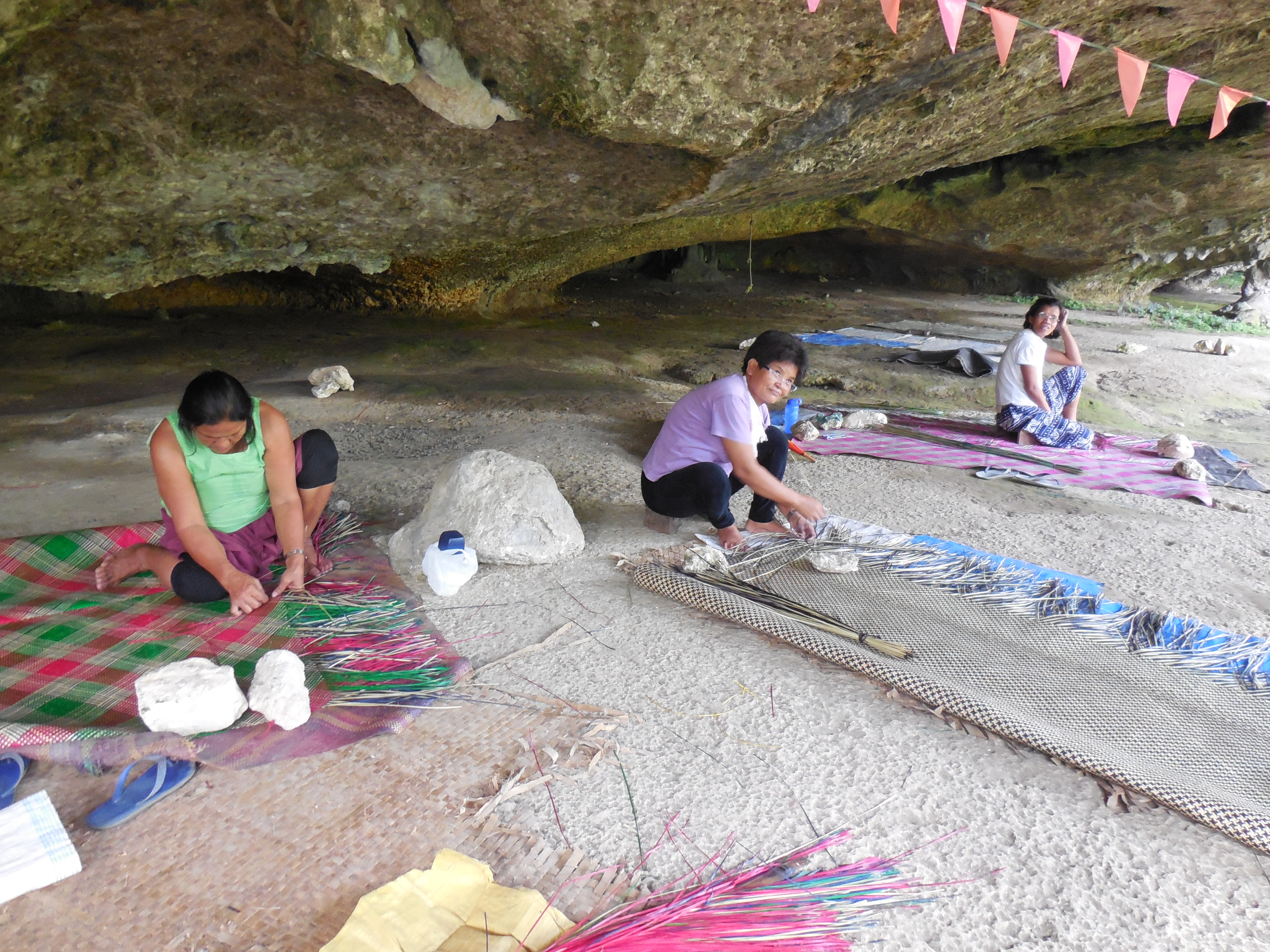
- Mat weaving taught at Saob Cave in Basey, Samar

Information
- Established: 1995
- Authority: National Commission for Culture and the Arts
- UNESCO Intangible Cultural Heritage
- Country: Philippines
- Domains: Knowledge and practices concerning nature and the universe; oral traditions and expressions; performing arts; social practices, rituals and festive events; and traditional craftsmanship
- Reference: 01739
- Region: Asia and the Pacific

Inscription history
- Inscription: 2021 (16th session)
- List: Good Safeguarding Practices

The Schools of Living Traditions (SLTs) are education institutions in the Philippines dedicated to indigenous arts, crafts and other traditions.

The National Commission for Culture and the Arts (NCCA) under Felipe M. de Leon, Jr. launched its program on SLTs in 1995. The NCCA supports SLTs as part of the UNESCO's mandate to preserve living traditions of the indigenous peoples. SLTs are community-managed centers of learning headed by cultural masters and specialists who teaches knowledge or skills on a particular art, craft and tradition to the youth. The conduct of teaching in SLTs is often non-formal, oral and with practical demonstrations. There are currently 28 SLTs being implemented across the Philippines.

In 2021, the SLTs were included in the Register of Good Safeguarding Practices under the UNESCO Intangible Cultural Heritage List. The inclusion in the UNESCO list recognizes the efforts of the SLTs to safeguard traditional and cultural knowledge and practices from the potential negative effects of modernization.

In December 2024, the Philippines submitted its latest UNESCO periodic report on safeguarding intangible cultural heritage, which highlighted the expansion and improved sustainability measures of the SLT program. The report underscored increased community funding support through the NCCA’s 2025 cultural grants and ongoing capacity‑building efforts, with full evaluation to take place in mid‑2025.

== List of Schools of Living Traditions ==
- Lake Sebu SLT teaches T'nalak weaving, and T'boli music and dance to local children
