= Sampaguitas y otras poesías varias =

Sampaguitas y otras poesías varias (Jasmines and Other Various Poems), also known as Sampaguitas y poesías varias, (Jasmines and Varied Poems) is the first book of poetry published by a Filipino in Europe. The poems were written in the Spanish language by Pedro Paterno, a Filipino poet, novelist, politician, and former seminarian. The Tagalog word sampaguita (uses the Spanish-style spelling of "sampagita") in the title of the book refers to the Jasminum sambac, a species of jasmine that is native to the Philippines and other parts of southern Asia. Paterno read verses from the book at the Ateneo de Madrid.

== Description ==
Sampaguitas y otras poesias varias had five successive editions. Its first publication was in Madrid, Spain in 1880, where it was printed by the Imprenta de Fortanet. The second edition was published in 1881, and was printed by Imprenta de Cao y Val. The publisher of the book was Luis Arnedo, a friend of Paterno. The book contains poems that are religious, filial, and about love. The lead poem was La Cruz, meaning "The Cross".
