= Consuelo Paz =

Filipino linguist and ethnologist (1933–2022)

Consuelo Morales Joaquin-Paz (March 13, 1933 – September 15, 2022) was a Filipino linguist and ethnologist, and a retired professor at the University of the Philippines Diliman. Widely considered as the first female diachronic linguist from the Philippines, she is regarded as a pillar of modern Philippine linguistics and an important figure in the establishment and advancement of Filipino as the national language of the country.

== Life and education ==
She finished all her academic degrees at the University of the Philippines Diliman: Bachelor of Arts in English, Master of Arts in Linguistics, and PhD in Philippine Linguistics, and has served in various leadership capacities both in administration and research at UP Diliman. She was Dean of the UP Diliman's College of Social Sciences and Philosophy for two terms from 1992 to 1998. At the same university, she also helped established two research centers: Programa sa Pag-aaral ng Etnolinggwistikong Grupo (trans. Program for the Study of Ethnolinguistic Groups) and Center for International Studies. The establishment of these institutions enabled her to further her contributions to linguistic and cultural studies.

== Career ==
Touted as the “Grand Dame of Philippine Linguistics,” Paz has published numerous pioneering works on historical and comparative linguistics as well as sociolinguistics and ethnolinguistics, strengthening the connection between language studies and the social sciences. Her academic endeavors were focused primarily on the languages spoken in the Philippines, and how each has been contributing to the development of Filipino, the national and official language of the Philippines. She advocates that the evolution of the Filipino language should reflect its democratic nature, and should not privilege one dominant ethnolinguistic group over another. She has also conducted research studies that delved into the historical development of these languages and how they are used in contemporary social interactions. A Reconstruction of Proto-Philippine Phonemes and Morphemes, her doctoral dissertation, is now considered a milestone work in Philippine diachronic linguistics. Her works have been read and cited by linguists, language planners, and specialists of Austronesian culture.

A number of her articles were published in international academic journals, such as "The effects of language on social structures: The Philippine multilingual scene", "The nationalization of a language: Filipino", and "A multidisciplinary study of stigma in relation to Hansen’s disease among the Tausug." Some of her studies that are published in local journals such as "Wika sa konteksto ng komunidad" (Language in the context of the community), "Ang Filipino bilang linggwa frangka" (Filipino as lingua franca), "Ang Unibersal Nukleyus at ang Filipino" (The universal nucleus and Filipino) and "Wika ng naghaharing uri" (The language of the dominant class) among others, are still presently used in graduate and undergraduate linguistics and language studies courses at UP Diliman and other institutions in the country.

== Selected bibliography ==
=== Books ===
- Paz, C. (1981). A Reconstruction of Proto-Philippine Phonemes and Morphemes. Quezon City: Cecilio Lopez Archives of Philippine Languages and the Philippine Linguistic Circle.
- Paz, C. (1995). Ang Wikang Filipino: Atin Ito [The Filipino Language, Its Ours]. Quezon City: Sentro ng Wikang Filipino-Diliman.
- Paz, C., Hernandez, V., Peneyra, I. (2003). Pag-aaral ng Wika [The Study of Language]. Quezon City: University of the Philippines Press.
- Paz, C. (2005). Gabay sa Fildwurk [Guidebook on Fieldwork]. Quezon City: University of the Philippines Press.
- Paz, C. (ed.) (2009). Ginhawa, Dalamhati, Kapalaran: Essays on Well Being, Opportunity/Destiny, and Anguish. Quezon City: University of the Philippines Press.
