= Prudenciana Cruz =

Prudenciana C. Cruz
- Born: Prudenciana Dumagan Comiling; May 19, 1943 (age 83); Alburquerque, Bohol, Commonwealth of the Philippines
- Education: University of San Carlos; University of the Philippines Diliman
- Occupation: Librarian
- Title: Director of the National Library of the Philippines
- Spouse: Rodrigo A. Cruz

Prudenciana Comiling Cruz (born Prudenciana Dumagan Comiling; May 19, 1943) is the sixteenth director of the National Library of the Philippines, having acceded to the position on December 7, 2001. She is affectionately called "Nani" by both patrons and staff of the National Library, alluding to her motherly qualities and her use of these qualities in running the library.

== Biography ==
Cruz was born in Alburquerque, Bohol on May 19, 1943, the second of four children born to Dionisio Comiling and Victoriano Dumagan. She graduated from the University of San Carlos in Cebu City majoring in library science, and later on completing her graduate studies at the University of the Philippines Diliman.

Cruz began her career as a librarian in 1964 at the Divine Word College of Tagbilaran (presently Holy Name University), where she served as chief librarian. In 1970, she became senior librarian of the Bohol Provincial Library, and later on joined the ranks of the National Library of the Philippines. She was appointed director of the National Library by President Gloria Macapagal Arroyo on December 7, 2001, at the recommendation of her predecessor, Adoracion B. Mendoza, to whom she served as assistant director.

During her tenure as director of the National Library, she has served as head of the steering committee in charge of the Philippine eLibrary. In addition, the Children's Library and the Philippine President's Room of the Filipiniana Division were opened in 2007.

=== Private life ===
Cruz is married to Rodrigo A. Cruz, a retired expert on livestock production. They have three children and three grandchildren.

== Awards ==
- 2004: Philippine Librarians Association Hall of Fame Award
- 2005: ADOC Award for Best e-Practices
- 2006: Philippine Librarians Association Service Award
- 2006: Ten Outstanding Boholanos Around the World
- 2007: Outstanding Librarian Award, Professional Regulation Commission
- 2008: Sectoral Awardee in Government, Ulirang Ina 2008
