= Nínay =

Book by Pedro Paterno

Ninay
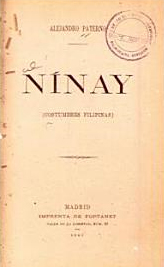
- Bookcover/title page for the original Spanish version of Ninay by Pedro A. Paterno.
- Author: Pedro Alejandro Paterno
- Original title: Nínay (costumbres filipinas)
- Language: Spanish, English, and Tagalog
- Genre: Cultural novel
- Publisher: Imprenta de Fortanet (Madrid) and Limbagan Nang La Republika Kiotan Bilang 30
- Publication date: 1885, 1907, and 1908
- Publication place: Spain and Philippines
- Media type: Print (Hardback)
- Pages: 262

Nínay is a novel in the Spanish language written by Pedro Alejandro Paterno, and is the first novel authored by a native Filipino. Paterno authored this novel when he was twenty-three years old and while living in Spain in 1885, the novel was later translated into English in 1907 and into Tagalog in 1908. According to Dominador D. Buhain in his book A History of Publishing in the Philippines, being the first Filipino novel, Ninay marked the beginning of the awakening of national consciousness among the Filipino intelligentsia. Being a "largely cultural" novel, the narrative provides a "folkloristic tour" of the distinctive culture of the Philippines. Composed of 262 pages, the 1908 Tagalog version of the novel was published by the Limbagan Nang La Republika Kiotan Bilang 30 during the American period in Philippine history.

== Plot ==
The novel explores the life and love story of the female protagonist named Ninay, a heartbroken young woman who died of cholera. Her heartbreak was due to her separation from her lover Carlos Mabagsic. Ninay's misfortune became harder to bear because of the loss of her parents. A pasiam, the novena for the dead, was being said and offered for the lifeless Ninay. Framed with this melancholic atmosphere of nine-day prayer for the departed, the novel opens up a succession of narratives that present "variations of unrequited love". The first condemned relationship was between Ninay and her lover Carlos Mabagsic. When Ninay was still alive, Mabagsic was falsely accused of being the leader of a rebellion. Mabagsic's accuser was Federico Silveyro, an entrepreneur from Portugal. Mabagsic went abroad. Upon his return, Mabagsic found out that Ninay confined herself in a convent. Mabagsic became a victim of cholera and died. Ninay also died of cholera. The other victims of the wickedness of the Portuguese Federico Silveyro were the couple named Loleng and Berto. Silveyro was the cause of Loleng's death. Berto avenged Loleng's death by killing Silveyro.

== Description ==
=== Reviews ===
Ninay has been reviewed by literary critics such as Claude Schumacher, Bienvenido Lumbera, Cynthia Nograles Lumbera, and Resil Mojares. According to Schumacher (1997), Paterno's Ninay is a novel that is "mediocre worth" because of being "little more than a framework" or an outline interleaved with "scenes and customs" of life the Philippines. On the contrary, Lumbera and Lumbera described Ninay as a novel with Philippine placenames and Filipino characters but "foreign", in the sense that the "locales and […] characters" were "overly romanticized". Mojares, on the other hand, reiterated that the novel is "distinctively Filipino" and it is a work that Paterno created as a form of reply to Philippine national hero Jose Rizal's recommendation that his "expatriate fellows work together to produce" a compilation that would represent the Philippines to a larger audience outside the country. Apart from Mojares's description of Ninay as a tool to present Philippine society and culture to non-Filipino readers, Eugenio Matibag explained in his The Spirit of Ninay that Ninay is a politically tinged piece of literature because it informs the public that Spain made the Philippines the "obverse of what European civilization stood for", meaning the civilization of Europe, particularly Spain, is supposed to have been the promoter and implementer of equality of all peoples.

=== Analysis ===
According to Adam Lifshey, an assistant professor in the Department of Spanish and Portuguese at Georgetown University in Washington, D.C. of the United States, Ninay is the first or inaugural Asian novel written in the Spanish language. Being such, Lifshey further described Ninay as a landmark text, an artifact that was deterritorialized and is fundamentally transnational because the novel is both Asian and European. Apart from being a window to the national customs of the Philippines, Ninay is a historia crítica or "critical history", a mode of writing based on historical documentation or historiography wherein Paterno attempted to confirm the Filipinos' claim and assertion of having a civilized status and civilization that existed prior to the arrival of the Spanish explorers in the Philippine archipelago, and to defend the Filipinos' fundamental resemblance to other peoples and the universality of the Philippine culture and customs.

Although published in Madrid Spain while the Philippines was still a Spanish colony, Ninay was conceived and written by an author who considered himself as a true Filipino. Ninay, the book, had been labeled as the first Filipino novel because it fell under the literary classification of the novel, meaning Ninay portrayed the contemporary life of human beings, in this case the Filipinos and their customs during the 1880s. However, although Ninay was a realistic and "fully developed novel", it has its imperfections. These flaws include having an artificial formal structure, having an inadequate melodramatic plot structure, a narrative lacking literary merit, being an undistinguished and loosely conceived story, and that it was created in order to entertain readers. In addition, it was a novel that deviated from the native narrative tradition of the Philippines. Despite the negative literary criticisms, Ninay is still an important novel because it was both an effort and a gap-filler in the literary history of the Philippines. The novel concentrated on the cultural aspect and characteristics of the Filipino people. Although described as a novel without valuable literary qualities, Ninay was an "exaltation of the pre-hispanic traces of civilization in the Philippines" and a work that prompted the production of other novels that highlighted the characteristics of Filipino identity.

=== Characters ===
The characters in Ninay is a mixture of native Filipinos (known then as indios) and peninsulares (Spaniards born in Spain), thus - in a way - a community of mestizos (half-breeds) with a hybrid culture. This is la filipinidad or "the Filipinoness" that Paterno showed in the novel.

Ninay, the character, appeared as a specter at the latter part of the novel. The apparition of Ninay represented the "ghostly image" or the spirit of the seemingly absent yet present Filipino image or national identity. The national identity of the Filipinos, according to Matibag, is personified in the traces of Ninay's presence but "contextualized" by the memory of Ninay.

=== Dedication ===
The original Spanish version of the novel was dedicated by Paterno to his father, a dedication that was written using the pre-Magellanic scripts of the baybayin, a linguistic rendering that was accompanied by the Spanish translation saying A mi querido padre, which means "To my beloved father" in English. Upon the arrival of the Americans as the replacement colonial ruler in the Philippines, Paterno dedicated the English version of Ninay to Helen "Nellie" Taft, the wife of then US President William Howard Taft. The actual phrase used to dedicate the novel to Helen Taft was To Mrs. William H. Taft, and it was placed on the page that was facing another page containing the photograph of the American first lady.

== Ninay in doll making ==
Ninay, the character, was adapted and transformed into a doll of the same name by Patis Tesoro, a well known Filipino fashion designer who utilizes indigenous materials such as cloths made from pineapple and abaca fibers. Together with Guia Gomez, Tesoro created "Ninay, The First Filipino Doll". Tesoro and Guia did not merely produce one representative doll of the character Ninay. Their so-called Ninay doll collection portrayed Ninay as a baby, as an adult, and as a grandmother. Through Ninay the doll, Tesoro and Guia portrayed the cultural and social life of Filipinos during the 19th century – the Spanish era – in Philippine history, as depicted in Ninay the novel. The "first edition" of the Ninay doll collection was composed 160 individual dolls that were 20 to 22 inches tall for Ninay as an adult and 8 to 12 inches tall for Ninay as a child.
