= List of Philippine laws =

Philippine laws

This article contains a partial list of Philippine laws.

== Sources of Philippine laws ==
Governmental power	Forms of law	Vested to
Constituent	Constitution and Amendments	Congress of the Philippines (convening as Constituent assembly); Elected delegates (convening as Constitutional Convention); People (through People's Initiative and constitutional ratification) (Note: Article XVII: Amendment and Revisions of the Constitution.)
Legislative	Statutes; Resolutions; Legal codes; Legislation and Ordinances (local and international law)	Congress of the Philippines (Note: Article VI: Legislative Department) People (through People's Initiative) Local government councils
Executive	Treaties; Executive agreement; Executive orders; Proclamations; Administrative orders; Official decrees; Other executive issuances	President of the Philippines (Note: Article VII: Executive Department)
Judicial	Judgments and court decisions; Orders; Resolutions; Administrative matters and judicial rules	Supreme Court and in such lower courts as may be established by law. (Note: Article VIII: Judicial Department)
Administrative	Regulations; Administrative judgments; Orders; Ordinances	Bureaucracy

Notes

*Customs may be considered as supplementary source of law, however, customs which are contrary to law, public order or public policy shall not be countenanced

== Abbreviations ==
Philippine laws have had various nomenclature designations at different periods in the history of the Philippines, as shown in the following table:

Nomenclature designation	Abbreviation	Form of government	Dates
Act	Act	Philippine government under United States sovereignty	1900–1935
Commonwealth Act	CA	Philippine Commonwealth	1935–1946
Republic Act	RA	Republic	1946–72, 1987–present
Presidential Decree	PD	Republic under Martial Law/Fourth Republic	1972–1986
Presidential Proclamation	PP		
Batas Pambansa	BP	Modified semi-presidential republic	1978–1985
Executive Order	EO		

== Notable laws ==
The following table lists Philippine laws that have been mentioned in Wikipedia or are otherwise notable. Only laws passed by Congress and its preceding bodies are listed here; presidential decrees and other executive issuances which may otherwise carry the force of law are excluded for the purpose of this table.

List of Notable Laws in the Philippines
Designation	Date passed	Result	Ref
Act 3815	December 8, 1930	The Revised Penal Code	
CA 1	December 21, 1935	The National Defense Act of 1935, which created the Armed Forces of the Philippines.	
RA 386	August 30, 1950	Civil Code of the Philippines	
RA 1425	June 12, 1956	The Rizal Act, which mandates the inclusion of courses on José Rizal in the curricula of all educational institutions in the Philippines.	
RA 1700	June 20, 1957	Anti-Subversion Act of 1957	
RA 4136	June 20, 1964	The Land Transportation and Traffic Code, which is the current traffic law governing Philippine land transportation.	
RA 5186	September 16, 1967	Investment Incentives Act	
RA 6135	August 31, 1970	Export Incentives Act of 1970	
BP 8	December 2, 1978	An act defining the Metric system and its units, providing for its implementation and for other purposes	
RA 6955	June 13, 1990	The Anti-Mail Order Bride Act	
RA 7160	October 10, 1991	Local Government Code of 1991	
RA 8293	June 6, 1997	The Intellectual Property Code of the Philippines (the copyright law).	
RA 8353	September 30, 1997	The Anti-Rape Act of 1997	
RA 8485	February 11, 1998	The Animal Welfare Act of 1998	
RA 9184	January 10, 2003	Government Procurement Reform Act, establishes the creation of the Government Procurement Policy Board (GPPB) and the Philippine Government Electronic Procurement System (PhilGEPS)	
RA 9208	May 26, 2003	Anti-Trafficking in Persons Act of 2003	
RA 9262	March 8, 2004	Anti-Violence Against Women and Their Children Act of 2004	
RA 9372	March 6, 2007	The Human Security Act of 2007	
RA 10066	March 26, 2010	National Cultural Heritage Act of 2009, establishing the Philippine Registry of Cultural Property	
RA 10175	September 12, 2012	The Cybercrime Prevention Act of 2012	
RA 10349	December 11, 2012	The AFP Modernization Act of 2012	
RA 10354	December 21, 2012	The Responsible Parenthood and Reproductive Health Act of 2012	
RA 10533	May 15, 2013	The Enhanced Basic Education Act of 2013	
RA 10535	May 15, 2013	The Philippine Standard Time (PST) Act of 2013	
RA 10591	May 29, 2013	Comprehensive Firearms and Ammunition Regulation Act	
RA 10667	July 21, 2015	Philippine Competition Act	
RA 10844	May 23, 2016	Department of Information and Communications Technology (DICT) Act of 2015	
RA 10913	July 21, 2016	Anti-Distracted Driving Act of 2016	
RA 10931	August 4, 2017	Universal Access to Quality Tertiary Education Act of 2017	
RA 10963	December 19, 2017	Tax Reform for Acceleration and Inclusion (TRAIN) Act of 2017	
RA 11054	July 26, 2018	Bangsamoro Organic Law	
RA 11055	August 6, 2018	Philippine Identification System Act	
RA 11106	October 30, 2018	Filipino Sign Language Act of 2018	
RA 11201	February 14, 2019	Department of Human Settlements and Urban Development (DHSUD) Act of 2019	
RA 11469	March 25, 2020	Bayanihan to Heal as One Act of 2020	
RA 11479	July 3, 2020	Anti-Terrorism Act of 2020	
RA 11494	September 11, 2020	Bayanihan to Recover as One Act of 2020	
RA 11641	December 30, 2021	Department of Migrant Workers (DMW) Act of 2021	
RA 11934	October 10, 2022	SIM Registration Act	
RA 11996	May 24, 2024	Eddie Garcia Law	

== Lists of laws by year ==
=== 2021 ===
Date approved	RA number	Title/category
2021-02-26	11524	An Act Creating the Coconut Farmers and Industry Trust Fund, Providing for Its Management and Utilization, Reconstituting for the Purpose the Philippine Coconut Authority Board, and for Other Purposes
2021-05-26	11549	An Act Lowering the Minimum Height Requirement for Applicants of the Philippine National Police (PNP), Bureau of Fire Protection (BFP), Bureau of Jail Management and Penology (BJMP), and Bureau of Corrections (BuCor), Amending Republic Act No. 6975, as Amended, Republic Act No. 9263, and Republic Act No. 10575
2021-10-28	11593	An Act Resetting the First Regular Elections in the Bangsamoro Autonomous Region in Muslim Mindanao, Amending for the Purpose, Section 13, Article XVI of Republic Act No. 11054, Otherwise Known as the "Organic Law for the Bangsamoro Autonomous Region in Muslim Mindanao"
2021-12-10	11596	An Act Prohibiting the Practice of Child Marriage and Imposing Penalties for Violations Thereof
2021-09-11	11494	An Act Providing for COVID-19 Response and Recovery Interventions, Providing Mechanisms to Accelerate the Recovery and Bolster the Resiliency of the Philippine Economy, Providing Funds Therefor, and for Other Purposes

=== 2020 ===
Date approved	RA number	Title/category
2020-01-08	11466	An Act Modifying the Salary Schedule for Civilian Government Personnel and Authorizing the Grant of Additional Benefits, And for Other Purposes.
2020-01-22	11467	A Law That Increases the Excise Tax On Alcohol Products, Electronic cigarettes (E-Cigarettes), And Heated Tobacco products (HTPS).
2020-01-24	11468	An Act Designating the Third Sunday of November Every Year as The National Day of Remembrance for Road Crash Victims, Survivors, And Their Families.

=== 2019 ===
Date approved	RA number	Title/category

=== 2018 (10967–11166) ===
Date approved	RA number	Title/category
2018-01-03	10967	Creating a Barangay: Barangay Pudo
2018-01-16	10968	The Philippine Qualifications Framework (PQF) Act
2018-02-02	10969	Amending the "National Irrigation Administration Act" or RA 3601: Free Irrigation Service Act
2018-02-07	10970	Declaring Every August 25 as the National Tech-Voc Day
2018-02-07	10971	Creating a Barangay: Barangay Poblacion 3
2018-02-22	10972	Telecommunications Franchise Renewal: Now Telecom Company, Inc (Formerly, Infocom Communications Network, Inc)
2018-03-01	10973	Amending the Department of the Interior and Local Government Act of 1990 or RA 6975: Granting the PNP Chief and the CIDG Director and deputy director to Administer Oath and Issue Subpoena and Subpoena Duces Tecum
2018-03-06	10974	Radio and Television Broadcasting Franchise Renewal: Sarraga Integrated and Management Corporation
2018-03-06	10975	Establishing a National High School: Emilio Jacinto National High School
2018-03-06	10976	Establishing a National High School: Paso De Blas National High School
2018-03-06	10977	Converting a National High School into a National Vocational High School: San Rafael Technological and Vocational High School
2018-03-06	10978	Converting a High School Annex into an Independent National High School: Don Bosco National High School
2018-03-06	10979	Establishing a National High School: Manlilisid National High School
2018-03-06	10980	Changing the Name of a National High School: Caibiran National High School
2018-03-06	10981	Converting a High School Annex into an Independent National High School: Musimut National High School
2018-03-14	10982	Establishing an Elementary School: Antonio M. Serapio Elementary School
2018-03-14	10983	Establishing a National High School: SSS National High School
2018-03-14	10984	Establishing a National High School: Ligao City National Technical-Vocational High School
2018-03-14	10985	Establishing a National Science High School: Pagadian City Science High School
2018-03-14	10986	Establishing a National High School: Banahao National High School
2018-03-14	10987	Establishing a National High School: Hampangan National High School
2018-03-14	10988	Converting a High School Annex into an Independent National High School: San Antonio National High School (Parañaque)
2018-03-14	10989	Converting a High School Annex into an Independent National High School: Tawit National High School
2018-03-21	10990	Establishing a National High School: Justice Eliezer R. De Los Santos High School
2018-03-21	10991	Establishing a National High School: Bagbaguin National High School
2018-03-21	10992	Converting a High School Annex into an Independent National High School: Tublay National Trade High School
2018-03-21	10993	Converting a High School Annex into an Independent National High School: Malagnat National High School
2018-03-21	10994	Converting a High School Annex into an Independent National High School: Santor National High School
2018-03-21	10995	Establishing a National High School: Depase National High School
2018-03-21	10996	Converting a High School Annex into an Independent National High School: Daklan National High School
2018-03-21	10997	Converting a High School Annex into an Independent National High School: Sacpil National High School
2018-03-21	10998	Converting a High School Annex into an Independent National High School: Guina-ang National High School
2018-03-21	10999	Radio and Television Broadcasting Franchise: Iloilo Baptist Church, Inc.
2018-03-21	11000	Radio and Television Broadcasting Franchise Renewal: Subic Broadcasting Corporation
2018-03-21	11001	Radio and Television Broadcasting Franchise Renewal: Word Broadcasting Corporation (Formerly, Filipinas Broadcasting Association, Inc)
2018-03-27	11002	Radio and Television Broadcasting Franchise: Pangasinan Gulf Waves Network Corporation
2018-03-27	11003	Radio Broadcasting Franchise Renewal: Beta Broadcasting System, Inc.
2018-03-27	11004	Radio and Television Broadcasting Franchise Renewal: Gateway Television Broadcasting, Inc (Also Known as Hope Channel Philippines. Formerly, Gateway U.H.F. Television Broadcasting, Inc)
2018-03-27	11005	Amending RA 10597's Provision on CHED Requirements Compliance for the Establishment the Northern Iloilo State University
2018-03-27	11006	Amending RA 10596's Provision on CHED Requirements Compliance for the Conversion of the Mindoro State College of Agriculture and Technology into the Mindoro State University (MINSU)
2018-03-27	11007	Establishing a National Science and Mathematics High School: Malabon City National Science and Mathematics High School
2018-03-27	11008	Amending RA 10598's Provision on CHED Requirements Compliance for the Establishment of the Compostela Valley State College
2018-03-27	11009	Amending RA 10594's Provision on CHED Requirements Compliance for the Conversion of Talisay City College into the Talisay City State College
2018-03-27	11010	Amending RA 10600's Provision on CHED Requirements Compliance for the Establishment of the Surigao Del Norte State University
2018-03-27	11011	Amending RA 10583's Provision on CHED Requirements Compliance for the Conversion of the Mountain Province State Polytechnic College into the Mountain Province State University
2018-04-04	11012	Amending RA 10604's Provision on CHED Requirements Compliance for the Conversion of Four Colleges into the Iloilo State University of Fisheries Science and Technology
2018-04-04	11013	Amending RA 10585's Provision on CHED Requirements Compliance for the Conversion of the Cotabato City Polytechnic College into the Cotabato State University
2018-04-05	11014	Declaring Every January 23 a Special Working Holiday to Commemorate the Declaration of the First Philippine Republic
2018-04-20	11015	Renaming an Educational Institution: The President Ramon Magsaysay State University (PRMSU)
2018-05-25	11016	Converting a High School Annex into an Independent National High School: Biga National High School
2018-05-25	11017	Establishing a National High School: Lingunan National High School
2018-05-25	11018	Converting an Elementary School into an Integrated School: Licop Integrated School
2018-05-25	11019	Integrating an Extension Campus as a Regular Campus: Dr. Emilio B. Espinosa Sr. Memorial State College of Agriculture and Technology – Cawayan Campus
2018-05-25	11020	Establishing a National Science High School: Balanga City National Science High School
2018-05-25	11021	Converting a High School Annex into an Independent National High School: Patawag National High School
2018-05-25	11022	Converting a High School Annex into an Independent National High School: Pianon National High School
2018-05-25	11023	Establishing a National High School: Catigan National High School
2018-05-25	11024	Establishing a National High School: Mt. Apo National High School
2018-05-25	11025	Establishing a National High School: Talisay National High School
2018-05-25	11026	Establishing a National High School: Corporacion National High School
2018-05-25	11027	Establishing a National High School: Magdug National High School
2018-05-25	11028	Establishing a National High School: Digon National High School
2018-05-25	11029	Converting a High School Annex into an Independent National High School: Luisa Joyce Mallari National High School
2018-05-25	11030	Creating a Barangay: Upper Pugaan
2018-05-25	11031	Converting a High School Annex into an Independent National High School: Benjamin Velasco Bautista Sr. National High School
2018-05-28	11032	Amending the Anti-Red Tape Act of 2007 or RA 9485: The Ease of Doing Business and Efficient Government Service Delivery Act of 2018
2018-05-28	11033	Converting a State College into a State University: Davao Oriental State University
2018-06-15	11034	Renaming a Road: Rodolfo G. Fariñas Jr. By-Pass Road
2018-06-15	11035	Balik Scientist Act
2018-06-20	11036	Mental Health Act
2018-06-20	11037	Masustansyang Pagkain para sa Batang Pilipino Act
2018-06-22	11038	Amending the National Integrated Protected Areas System (NIPAS) Act of 1992 or RA 7586: the Expanded National Integrated Protected System Act of 2018
2018-06-29	11039	Electric Cooperatives Emergency and Resiliency Fund Act
2018-06-29	11040	Declaring Every April 27 a Special Working Holiday throughout the Country and a Special Nonworking Holiday in Lapu-Lapu City to Commemorate the Victory of Lapu-Lapu over Ferdinand Magellan
2018-06-29	11041	Renaming a Road: Benigno S. Aquino Jr. National Highway
2018-06-29	11042	Renaming a Road: Gov. Bado Dangwa National Road
2018-06-29	11043	Renaming a Road: Salvador H. Escudero III Diversion Road
2018-06-29	11044	Renaming a Road: General Licerio I. Geronimo Highway
2018-06-29	11045	Renaming a Road: Corazon C. Aquino Avenue
2018-06-29	11046	Renaming a Road: Isaac O. Tolentino Avenue
2018-06-29	11047	Renaming a Road: Juanito R. Remulla Sr. Road
2018-06-29	11048	Renaming a Road: Bacoor-Dasmariñas National Road
2018-06-29	11049	Renaming a Road: Bacoor Boulevard
2018-06-29	11050	Renaming a Road: Metro Iligan Regional Agro-Industrial Center (MIRAIC) Highway
2018-06-29	11051	Renaming a Road: Arsenio Arcelo Quibranza Highway
2018-06-29	11052	Philippine Food Technology Act
2018-06-29	11053	Amending RA 8049 or the Anti Hazing Act: Anti-Hazing Act of 2018
2018-07-27	11054	Organic Act for the Bangsamoro Autonomous Region in Muslim Mindanao: Repealing RA 6734 and RA 9054 or the Organic Acts for the Autonomous Region in Muslim Mindanao
2018-08-06	11055	Philippine Identification System Act
2018-08-09	11056	PUP-Sablayan Campus Act
2018-08-17	11057	Personal Property Security Act
2018-08-17	11058	Occupational Safety and Health Standards (OSHS) Act
2018-08-17	11059	Retirement Act of the Office of the Ombudsman
2018-08-17	11060	Converting a High School Annex into an Independent National High School: Emeliano S. Fontanares Sr. National High School
2018-08-17	11061	Renaming a Road: Cong. Andres Acop Cosalan Road
2018-08-17	11062	Converting an Extension Office into a Regular Office (LTO)
2018-08-17	11063	Converting an Extension Office into a Regular Office (LTO)
2018-08-23	11064	Renaming a Road: Anos Fonacier Circumferential Road
2018-08-23	11065	Converting an Extension Office into a Regular Office (LTO)
2018-08-23	11066	Converting an Extension Office into a Regular Office (LTO)
2018-08-23	11067	Converting an Extension Office into a Regular Office (LTO)
2018-08-23	11068	Converting an Extension Office into a Regular Office (LTO)
2018-09-14	11069	Reapportioning Legislative Districts of Cavite
2018-08-23	11070	Converting a High School Annex into an Independent National High School: Pedro Mariscal National High School
2018-08-23	11071	Converting an Elementary School into an Integrated School: Mamagum Integrated School
2018-08-23	11072	Establishing a National High School: Felina Sevilla Oaminal National High School
2018-08-23	11073	Converting an Elementary School into an Integrated School: Mabuhay Integrated School
2018-08-23	11074	Establishing a National High School: Disciplina Village-Bignay National High School
2018-08-23	11075	Establishing a National High School: Tiblac National High School
2018-08-23	11076	Establishing a National High School: President Corazon "Cory" C. Aquino National High School
2018-09-24	11077	Reapportioning Legislative Districts of Aklan
2018-09-24	11078	Creating a Legislative District: Lone District of Calamba City
2018-09-27	11079	Integrating a college into a State University: Southern Leyte State University – Maasin City Campus
2018-09-27	11080	Reapportioning Legislative Districts of Isabela
2018-09-28	11081	Converting a Regional Hospital into a Medical Center: Region II Trauma and Medical Center
2018-09-28	11082	Converting a Hospital into a Medical Center: Southern Isabela Medical Center
2018-09-28	11083	Increasing Bed Capacity of a Hospital: La Union Medical Center with an Upgrade of Services, Facilities and Professional Health Care, and Increased Medical Personnel
2018-09-28	11084	Increasing Bed Capacity of a Hospital: Baguio General Hospital and Medical Center with an Upgrade of Services, Facilities and Professional Health Care, and Increased Medical Personnel
2018-09-28	11085	Increasing Bed Capacity of a Hospital: Dr. Paulino J. Garcia Memorial Research and Medical Center Extension Hospital with an Upgrade of Services, Facilities and Professional Health Care, and Increased Medical Personnel
2018-10-05	11086	Converting a Municipality into a Component City: Santo Tomas
2018-10-10	11087	Increasing Bed Capacity of a Hospital: Zamboanga City Medical Center with an Upgrade of Services, Facilities and Professional Health Care, and Increased Medical Personnel (Amending RA 7272)
2018-10-11	11088	Converting a State College into a State University: Sorsogon State University
2018-10-18	11089	Telecommunications Franchise: Streamtech Systems Technologies, Inc
2018-10-18	11090	Converting a High School Annex into an Independent National High School: Alameda National High School
2018-10-18	11091	Converting a High School Annex into an Independent National High School: San Pablo National High School
2018-10-18	11092	Converting a High School Annex into an Independent National High School: Malanday National High School
2018-10-18	11093	Establishing a National High School: Tambo National High School
2018-10-18	11094	Establishing a National High School: Veinte Reales National High School
2018-10-18	11095	Establishing an Elementary School: Silverio Elementary School
2018-10-18	11096	Converting a High School Annex into an Independent National High School: Santa Ana National High School
2018-10-18	11097	Converting a High School Annex into an Independent National High School: Upper Katungal National High School
2018-10-18	11098	Converting a College Campus into an Independent College: Ragay Polytechnic Skills Institute Act
2018-10-18	11099	Radio Broadcasting Franchise Renewal: Notre Dame Broadcasting Corporation
2018-10-26	11100	Declaring Every May 15 as Special Nonworking Holiday in Celebration of the "Adlaw Nan Probinsya Nan Surigao Del Norte": Repealing RA 7553
2018-10-26	11101	Declaring Every June 18 as Special Nonworking Holiday in Commemoration of the Founding of the Ifugao Province
2018-10-26	11102	Establishing a Provincial Hospital: Soccsksargen General Hospital
2018-10-30	11103	Increasing Bed Capacity of a Hospital: Amai Pakpak Medical Center with an Upgrade of Services, Facilities and Professional Health Care, and Increased Medical Personnel
2018-10-30	11104	Increasing Bed Capacity of a Hospital: Luis Hora Memorial Regional Hospital with an Upgrade of Services, Facilities and Professional Health Care, and Increased Medical Personnel
2018-10-30	11105	Converting an Extension Office into a Regular Office (LTO)
2018-10-30	11106	The Filipino Sign Language Act
2018-10-30	11107	Changing the Name of a Medical Institution: Bataan General Hospital and Medical Center with Increased Bed Capacity and Medical Personnel, and Upgrade of Services, Facilities and Professional Health Care
2018-10-30	11108	Changing the Name of a Medical Institution: Bicol Region General Hospital and Geriatric Medical Center (BRGHGMC) with Increased Bed Capacity and Medical Personnel, and Upgrade of Services, Facilities and Professional Health Care
2018-10-30	11109	Radio and Television Broadcasting Franchise Renewal: Manila Broadcasting Company
2018-10-30	11110	Radio and Television Broadcasting Franchise Renewal: Bright Star Broadcasting Network Corporation
2018-10-30	11111	Radio and Television Broadcasting Franchise Renewal: Vanguard Radio Network Company, Inc.
2018-10-30	11112	Creating a Barangay: Poblacion 2
2018-10-30	11113	Declaring Every March 24 as Special Nonworking Holiday in Ligao City in Commemoration of its Foundation
2018-10-30	11114	Declaring Every December 8 as Special Nonworking Holiday in Agoo Municipality in Commemoration of its Foundation
2018-10-30	11115	Declaring Every June 16 as Special Nonworking Holiday in Villanueva Municipality in Commemoration of its Foundation
2018-10-30	11116	Declaring Every September 17 as Special Nonworking Holiday in Los Baños Municipality in Commemoration of its Foundation and the annual Bañamos Festival
2018-10-30	11117	Declaring Every July 4 as Special Nonworking Holiday in Lanao Del Norte Province in Commemoration of its Foundation
2018-10-30	11118	Declaring Every May 22 as Special Nonworking Holiday in Guimaras Province in Commemoration of its Foundation
2018-10-30	11119	Declaring Every April 3 as Special Nonworking Holiday in Albay Province in Commemoration of its Foundation
2018-10-30	11120	Declaring Every September 2 as Special Nonworking Holiday in Ifugao Province in Commemoration of the Surrender of the Japanese Imperial Army in the Philippines in World War II
2018-10-30	11121	Declaring Every November 2 as Special Nonworking Holiday in Misamis Occidental Province in Commemoration of its Foundation
2018-10-30	11122	Declaring Every September 21 as Special Working Holiday in Cebu Province in Commemoration of the "Cebu Press Freedom Day"
2018-10-30	11123	Declaring Every November 15 as Special Nonworking Holiday in Occidental Mindoro Province in Commemoration of its Foundation
2018-10-30	11124	Declaring Every September 7 as Special Nonworking Holiday in Cavite City in Commemoration of its Cityhood
2018-10-30	11125	Declaring Every June 17 as Special Nonworking Holiday in Agusan Del Sur Province in Commemoration of its Foundation
2018-10-30	11126	Declaring Every November 22 as Special Nonworking Holiday in Sultan Kudarat Province in Commemoration of its Foundation
2018-10-30	11127	The National Payment Systems Act
2018-11-08	11128	Declaring Every July 4 as Special Nonworking Holiday in Cadiz City in Commemoration of its Cityhood
2018-11-08	11129	Declaring Every June 27 as Special Nonworking Holiday in El Salvador City in Commemoration of its Cityhood
2018-11-08	11130	Declaring Every December 1 as Special Nonworking Holiday in Padre Garcia in Commemoration of its Foundation and the annual Kabakahan Festival
2018-11-08	11131	The Philippine Criminology Profession Act of 2018: Repealing the Creation of the Board of Examiners for Criminologists with RA 6506
2018-11-09	11132	Declaring Every March 21 as Special Nonworking Holiday in San Fabian Municipality in Commemoration of its Foundation
2018-11-09	11133	Declaring Every July 22 as Special Nonworking Holiday in Claveria Municipality in Commemoration of its Foundation
2018-11-09	11134	Declaring Every June 11 as Special Nonworking Holiday in Sagay City in Commemoration of its Foundation
2018-11-09	11135	Declaring Every October 28 as Special Nonworking Holiday in Davao Occidental Province in Commemoration of its Foundation
2018-11-09	11136	Declaring Every September 2 as Special Nonworking Holiday in Albay Province in Commemoration of the Birth Anniversary of General Simeon A. Ola
2018-11-09	11137	Declaring Every August 2 as Special Nonworking Holiday in Butuan City in Commemoration of its Cityhood
2018-11-09	11138	Declaring Every January 11 as Special Nonworking Holiday in Bataan Province in Commemoration of its Foundation
2018-11-09	11139	Declaring Every October 26 as Special Nonworking Holiday in Catanduanes Province in Commemoration of its Foundation
2018-11-09	11140	Declaring Every December 2 as Special Nonworking Holiday in Pasay City in Commemoration of its Foundation
2018-11-09	11141	Declaring Every July 1 as Special Nonworking Holiday in Alubijid Municipality in Commemoration of its Foundation
2018-11-09	11142	Declaring Every September 1 as Special Nonworking Holiday in Jasaan Municipality in Commemoration of its Foundation
2018-11-09	11143	Declaring Every June 15 as Special Nonworking Holiday in Opol Municipality in Commemoration of its Foundation
2018-11-09	11144	Declaring Every June 19 as Special Nonworking Holiday in Laguna Province in Commemoration of the Birth Anniversary of Jose P. Rizal
2018-11-09	11145	Declaring Every April 21 as Special Nonworking Holiday in Orani Municipality in Commemoration of its Foundation
2018-11-09	11146	Declaring Every June 18 as Special Nonworking Holiday in Bacolod City in Commemoration of its Cityhood
2018-11-09	11147	Increasing Bed Capacity of a Hospital: Governor Alfredo Mendoza Abueg Sr. Memorial Hospital with an Upgrade of Services, Facilities and Professional Health Care, and Increased Medical Personnel
2018-11-29	11148	Kalusugan at Nutrisyon ng Mag-Nanay Act
2018-11-09	11149	Granting Citizenship to a Person
2018-12-13	11150	Converting a School into a State College: South Cotabato State College
2018-12-14	11151	Telecommunications Franchise Renewal: Innove Communications, Inc. (Formerly, Isla Communications Company, Inc (ISLACOM) )
2018-12-14	11152	Converting an Extension Office into a Regular Office (LTO)
2018-12-14	11153	Establishing a Regular Office (LTO)
2018-12-14	11154	Establishing an Extension Office (LTO)
2018-12-14	11155	Establishing a Regular Office (LTO)
2018-12-14	11156	Establishing a Regular Office (LTO)
2018-12-14	11157	Establishing an Extension Office (LTO)
2018-12-14	11158	Converting an Extension Office into a Regular Office (LTO)
2018-12-14	11159	Granting Citizenship to a Person
2018-12-14	11160	Granting Citizenship to a Person
2018-12-14	11161	Granting Citizenship to a Person
2018-12-20	11162	Establishing an Extension Office (LTO)
2018-12-20	11163	Declaring Every Last Monday of January as Special Working Holiday in Observance of National Bible Day Act
2018-12-20	11164	Increasing the Monthly Old-Age Pension for Senior Veterans
2018-12-20	11165	Telecommuting Act
2018-12-20	11166	Philippine HIV and AIDS Policy Act: Repealing the Philippine AIDS Prevention and Control Act of 1998, or RA 8504

=== 2017 (10925–10966) ===
Date approved	RA number	Title/category
2017-01-25	10905	Creating the Development of Manila Bay Freeport Zone
2017-04-21	10925	Radio and Television Broadcasting Franchise Renewal: GMA Network, Inc (Formerly, Republic Broadcasting System, Inc.)
2017-04-21	10926	Telecommunications Franchise Renewal: Smart Communications, Inc (Formerly, Smart Information Technologies, Inc)
2017-07-14	10927	Amending the Anti-Money Laundering Act of 2001or RA 9160: Designating Casinos as "Covered Persons"
2017-08-02	10928	Amending the Philippine Passport Act of 1996or RA 8239: Extending the Validity of Philippine Passports
2017-08-02	10929	Free Internet Access in Public Places Act
2017-08-02	10930	Amending the Land Transportation and Traffic Codeor RA 4136: Rationalizing and Strengthening the Policy Regarding Driver's License by Extending License Validity Period and Penalizing Acts in Violations of its Issuance and Application
2017-08-03	10931	Universal Access to Quality Tertiary Education Act
2017-08-03	10932	Amending the "Anti-Hospital Deposit Act", or BP 702: Increasing the Penalties on Hospitals and Medical Clinics
2017-08-23	10933	Subdividing a Barangay: New Barangays NBBS Proper, NBBS Kaunlaran, and NBBS Dagat-Dagatan from the Now Defunct Barangay North Bay Boulevard South (NBBS)
2017-08-23	10934	Subdividing a Barangay: New Barangays Tangos North and Tangos South from the Now Defunct Barangay Tangos
2017-08-23	10935	Subdividing a Barangay: New Barangays Tanza 1 and Tanza 2 from the Now Defunct Barangay Tanza
2017-08-23	10936	Creating a Barangay: Barangay Comawas
2017-08-23	10937	Establishing a Marine Hatchery
2017-08-23	10938	Establishing a Marine Hatchery
2017-08-23	10939	Establishing a Marine Hatchery
2017-08-23	10940	Establishing a Marine Hatchery
2017-08-23	10941	Establishing a Marine Hatchery
2017-08-23	10942	Establishing a Marine Hatchery
2017-08-23	10943	Establishing a Marine Hatchery
2017-08-23	10944	Establishing a Marine Hatchery
2017-08-23	10945	Establishing a Marine Hatchery
2017-08-23	10946	Establishing a Marine Hatchery
2017-08-23	10947	Establishing a Marine Hatchery
2017-08-23	10948	Establishing a Marine Hatchery
2017-08-23	10949	Establishing a Marine Hatchery
2017-08-23	10950	Establishing a Marine Hatchery
2017-08-29	10951	Amending the Revised Penal Code or Act 3815: Adjusting the Amount or the Value of Property and Damage on Which a Penalty is Based, and the Fines Imposed
2017-10-02	10952	Amending the Synchronized Barangay and Sangguniang Kabataan Elections Act or RA 9164: Postponing the October 2017 Barangay and Sangguniang Kabataan Elections (spent)
2017-10-30	10953	Subdividing a Barangay: New Barangays Alfonso Angliongto Sr. and Vicente Hizon Sr. from, now smaller, Barangay Pampanga
2017-10-30	10954	Subdividing a Barangay: New Barangays Magugpo Poblacion, Magugpo East, Magugpo West, Magugpo North, and Magugpo South from the Now Defunct Barangay Magugpo
2017-10-30	10955	Subdividing a Barangay: New Barangays Kalaw, Cabaritan, and Quibel from the Now Defunct Barangay Dumalneg
2017-10-30	10956	Creating a Barangay: Barangay Care
2017-10-30	10957	Creating a Barangay: Barangay Liwon
2017-10-30	10958	Subdividing a Barangay: New Barangays Canumay West and Canumay East from the Now Defunct Barangay Canumay
2017-11-08	10959	Creating a Barangay: Barangay Cristo Rey
2017-11-08	10960	Creating a Barangay: Barangay San Isidro
2017-11-08	10961	Creating a Barangay: Barangay Rizal
2017-12-19	10962	Gift Check Act of 2017
2017-12-19	10963	Amending the National Internal Revenue Code of 1997 or RA 8424: Tax Reform for Acceleration and Inclusion (TRAIN)
2017-12-19	10964	Appropriations Act of 2018
2017-12-28	10965	Establishing a National Science High School: Rodolfo CG. Fariñas Jr. National Science High School
2017-12-28	10966	Declaring Every December 8 as Special Nonworking Holiday in Commemoration of the Feast of the Immaculate Conception of Mary

=== 2016 (10740–10924) ===
Date approved	RA number	Title/category
2016-01-03	10740	Converting a High School Annex into an Independent National High School: Corazon C. Aquino National High School
2016-01-12	10741	Making Gregorio Manio V as the new National Hero
2016-01-15	10742	Sangguniang Kabataan Reform Act of 2015
2016-01-29	10743	Declaring Every October 5 as National Teachers' Day
2016-02-06	10744	Credit Surety Fund Cooperative Act of 2015
2016-02-26	10745	Amending the Biofuels Act of 2006 or RA 9367: Allowing Use of Neat Diesel as Alternative Fuel in Natural Gas Power Generating Plants
2016-03-03	10746	Changing the Name of a National High School: Dr. Manuel T. Cases Sr. National High School
2016-03-03	10747	Rare Diseases Act of the Philippines
2016-03-07	10748	Changing the Name of an Elementary School: Dr. Manuel T. Cases Sr. Elementary School
2016-03-07	10749	Changing the Name of an Elementary School: San Manuel Sur Elementary School
2016-03-07	10750	Changing the Name of a National High School: Sixto A. Abao National High School
2016-03-07	10751	Changing the Name of an Elementary School: Alberto G. Bautista Elementary School
2016-03-07	10752	The Right-of-Way Act
2016-03-07	10753	Radio and Television Broadcasting Franchise Renewal: Interactive Broadcast Media, Inc
2016-03-23	10754	Amending the Magna Carta For Persons with Disability: Expanding the Benefits and Privileges of Persons with Disability
2016-03-29	10755	Amending the Administrative Code of 1987 or EO 292: Authorizing Punong Barangay to Administer the Oath of Office of Any Government Official
2016-04-08	10756	Election Service Reform Act
2016-04-08	10757	Amending the Labor Code of the Philippines or PD 442: Reducing the Retirement Age of Surface Mine Workers
2016-04-15	10758	Converting an Extension Office into a Regular Office (LTO)
2016-04-15	10759	Converting an Extension Office into a Regular Office (LTO)
2016-04-15	10760	Creating a Regular District Office of the LTO
2016-04-15	10761	Creating a Regular District Office of the LTO
2016-04-15	10762	Converting an Extension Office into a Regular Office (LTO)
2016-04-15	10763	Creating a Regular District Office of the LTO
2016-04-15	10764	Creating a Regular District Office of the LTO
2016-04-15	10765	Converting an Extension Office into a Regular Office (LTO)
2016-04-19	10766	Amending The Human Rights Victims Reparation and Recognition Act of 2013 or RA 10368: Extending the Life of the Human Rights Victims Claims Board
2016-04-26	10767	Comprehensive Tuberculosis Elimination Plan Act
2016-04-26	10768	Declaring Every August 11 a Special Working Holiday in Iligan City in Commemoration of its Charter Day
2016-04-26	10769	Converting an Extension Office into a Regular Office (LTO)
2016-04-26	10770	Increasing Bed Capacity of a Hospital: Vicente Sotto Memorial Medical Center
2016-04-29	10771	Philippine Green Jobs Act of 2016
2016-05-03	10772	Radio and Television Broadcasting Franchise Renewal: Christian Era Broadcasting Service International Incorporated (RA 7618)
2016-05-03	10773	Radio and Television Broadcasting Franchise Renewal: Eagle Broadcasting Corporation (RA 7299)
2016-05-03	10774	Declaring Every March 9 a Special Working Holiday to Commemorate the Foundation of the Abra Province and the Culmination of the Abrenian Kawayan Festival
2016-05-03	10775	Declaring Every June 21 a Special Working Holiday in Tagaytay City in Commemoration of its Founding
2016-05-03	10776	Declaring Every May 8 as Special Working Holiday in Hermosa, Bataan
2016-05-03	10777	Declaring Every September 1 as Special Working Holiday in North Cotabato in Commemoration of Its Foundation
2016-05-03	10778	Converting a High School Annex into an Independent National High School: La Huerta National High School
2016-05-03	10779	Converting a High School Annex into an Independent National High School: Tabio National High School
2016-05-03	10780	Converting a High School Annex into an Independent National High School: Paraiso National High School
2016-05-03	10781	Creating a Regular District Office of the LTO
2016-05-03	10782	Creating a Regular District Office of the LTO
2016-05-03	10783	Converting an Extension Office into a Regular Office (LTO)
2016-05-03	10784	Converting an Extension Office into a Regular Office (LTO)
2016-05-03	10785	Establishing a Securities and Exchange Commission Office
2016-05-03	10786	Declaring Every 4th Week of September as the National Thyroid Cancer Awareness Week
2016-05-03	10787	Establishing a Marine Hatchery
2016-05-03	10788	Declaring Every April 16 as Special Working Holiday in Marikina City in Commemoration of its Foundation
2016-05-03	10789	Racehorse Jockeys Retirement Act
2016-05-03	10790	Radio and Television Broadcasting Franchise Renewal: Aliw Broadcasting Corporation (RA 7399)
2016-05-03	10791	Converting a High School Annex into an Independent National High School: Camp 30 National High School
2016-05-10	10792	Telecommunications Franchise Renewal: Contel Communications, Inc as Grantee and Assignee of Conception Industries, Inc, the Original Grantee (RA 7401)
2016-05-10	10793	Radio and Television Broadcasting Franchise Renewal: Radio Veritas-Global Broadcasting System, Inc (RA 7579)
2016-05-10	10794	Radio and Television Broadcasting Franchise Renewal: Mabuhay Broadcasting System, Inc (RA 7395)
2016-05-10	10795	Electric Power Distribution Franchise Renewal: Tarlac Electric, Inc (RA 7606)
2016-05-10	10796	Declaring a National Shrine: Balete Pass
2016-05-10	10797	Renaming an Educational Institution: Camp Jesse M. Robredo Regional Training Center 7 of the National Police Training Institute (Philippine Public Safety College)
2016-05-10	10798	Creating a Regular District Office of the LTO
2016-05-10	10799	Creating a Regular District Office of the LTO
2016-05-10	10800	Converting a State College into a State University: Tarlac Agricultural University
2016-05-10	10801	Overseas Workers Welfare Administration Act
2016-05-11	10802	Declaring Every July 4 as Special Working Holiday in the Lanao Del Sur Province in Commemoration of its Foundation
2016-05-11	10803	Declaring Every June 30 as Special Working Holiday in Imus City in Commemoration of its Foundation
2016-05-11	10804	Declaring Every September 29 as Special Working Holiday in Bacoor City in Commemoration of its Foundation
2016-05-11	10805	Declaring Every December 29 as Special Working Holiday in the Municipality of Leon in Honor of Captain Jose Calugas, Sr.
2016-05-11	10806	Declaring Every October 31 as Special Working Holiday in the Municipality of Porac in Commemoration of its Foundation
2016-05-11	10807	Declaring Every February 13 as Special Working Holiday in Parañaque City in Commemoration of its Foundation
2016-05-11	10808	Converting a High School into a National High School: Payatan National High School
2016-05-11	10809	Converting a High School Annex into an Independent National High School: Lamo National High School (Repealing RA 9779)
2016-05-11	10810	Converting a High School Annex into an Independent National High School: Malihud National High School
2016-05-11	10811	Converting a High School Annex into an Independent National High School: Monte Alegre National High School
2016-05-11	10812	Establishing a National High School: San Roque National High School
2016-05-11	10813	Establishing a Freshwater Hatchery
2016-05-13	10814	Declaring Every June 23 as Special Working Holiday in Bacoor City in Commemoration of its Cityhood
2016-05-16	10815	Establishing a TESDA Center: Rizal, Occidental Mindoro TESDA Training and Accreditation Center Act
2016-05-16	10816	Farm Tourism Development Act of 2016
2016-05-16	10817	Philippine Halal Export Development and Promotion Act of 2016
2016-05-18	10818	Radio and Television Broadcasting Franchise Renewal: Radio Mindanao Network, Inc
2016-05-18	10819	Radio and Television Broadcasting Franchise Renewal: Far East Broadcasting Companies (Philippines), Inc (RA 8115)
2016-05-18	10820	Radio and Television Broadcasting Franchise Renewal: Progressive Broadcasting Corporation (RA 7163, RA 8162)
2016-05-18	10821	Children's Emergency Relief and Protection Act
2016-05-18	10822	Telecommunications Franchise: Pipol Broadband and Telecommunications Corporation
2016-05-18	10823	Changing the Name of an Agricultural School: Nueva Vizcaya Polytechnic Institute
2016-05-18	10824	Changing the Name of a Fisheries School: Masbate Institute of Fisheries and Technology
2016-05-19	10825	Establishing a Marine Hatchery
2016-05-19	10826	Establishing a Marine Nursery
2016-05-19	10827	Converting an Extension Office into a Regular Office (LTO)
2016-05-19	10828	Creating a Regular District Office of the LTO
2016-05-11	10829	Establishing a National Science High School: Pasay City National Science High School
2016-05-11	10830	Converting an Elementary School into an Integrated School: Bakhaw Integrated School
2016-05-11	10831	Establishing a National High School: Balukbahan National High School
2016-05-11	10832	Establishing a National High School: Dionisio Lopez Sr. National High School
2016-05-11	10833	Converting a High School into a National High School: Bentuco National High School
2016-05-11	10834	Converting a High School Annex into an Independent National High School: Tinorongan National High School
2016-05-11	10835	Converting a High School Annex into an Independent National High School: Tulungatung National High School
2016-05-11	10836	Converting a High School Annex into an Independent National High School: Pasonanca National High School
2016-05-11	10837	Converting a High School Annex into an Independent National High School: Don Galo National High School
2016-05-11	10838	Converting a High School Annex into an Independent National High School: Malatgao National High School
2016-05-11	10839	Converting a National High School into a National Vocational High School: Sadanga National Technical-Vocational and Skills Training High School
2016-05-11	10840	Converting a National High School into a National Vocational High School: Saliok National Technical-Vocational and Skills Training High School
2016-05-11	10841	Converting a High School Annex into an Independent National High School: Matti National High School
2016-05-11	10842	Converting an Elementary School into an Integrated School: Hulo Integrated School
2016-05-11	10843	Converting an Elementary School into an Integrated School: Lakeview Integrated School
2016-05-23	10844	Department of Information and Communications Technology Act of 2015
2016-05-23	10845	Anti-Agricultural Smuggling Act of 2016
2016-05-23	10846	Amending RA 3591 Creating the Philippine Deposit Insurance Corporation: Enhancing the Resolution and Liquidation Framework for Banks
2016-05-23	10847	Amending RA 4373 on the Practice and Operation of Social Work in the Philippines: Lowering Board Examination Applicants' Age Requirement, Providing for Continuing Social Work Education, and Upgrading Other Provisions
2016-05-23	10848	Amending the Agricultural Tariffication Act (RA 8178): Extending the Implementation Period of the Agricultural Competitiveness Enhancement Fund (ACEF)
2016-05-23	10849	Renaming an Educational Institution: Romblon National Institute of Technology
2016-05-23	10850	Creating a Regular District Office of the LTO
2016-05-23	10851	Converting a National High School into a National Vocational High School: Judge Jose De Venecia Sr. Technical-Vocational Secondary School
2016-05-23	10852	Establishing a National High School: Santo Niño National High School
2016-05-23	10853	Converting a High School Annex into an Independent National High School: Carugmanan National High School
2016-05-23	10854	Converting a High School Annex into an Independent National High School: Malinao National High School
2016-05-23	10855	Converting a High School into a National High School: Irosin North National High School
2016-05-23	10856	Establishing a Marine Hatchery
2016-05-23	10857	Establishing Mangrove Crab Seed Banks, Nurseries, and Grow-Out Production Farms
2016-05-23	10858	Establishing a Marine Hatchery
2016-05-23	10859	Establishing a Marine Hatchery
2016-05-23	10860	Establishing a Marine Hatchery
2016-05-23	10861	Establishing a Provincial Fisheries and Aquatic Resources Training, Development and Production Center
2016-05-25	10862	Nutrition and Dietetics Act of 2016
2016-06-10	10863	Customs Modernization and Tariff Act (GMTA)
2016-06-10	10864	Amending the National Internal Revenue Code of 1997 or RA 8424: Defining Raw Sugar or Raw Cane Sugar
2016-06-23	10865	Converting a Regional Hospital into a Medical Center: Mayor Hilarion A. Ramiro Sr. Medical Center
2016-06-23	10866	Batanes Responsible Tourism Act
2016-06-23	10867	National Bureau of Investigation Reorganization and Modernization Act
2016-06-23	10868	Centenarians Act of 2016
2016-06-29	10869	JobStart Philippines Act
2016-07-17	10870	Philippine Credit Card Industry Regulation Act
2016-07-17	10871	Basic Life Support Training in Schools Act
2016-07-17	10872	Converting a High School Annex into an Independent National High School: Cordon National High School
2016-07-17	10873	Converting a High School Annex into an Independent National High School: Talifugo National High School
2016-07-17	10874	Converting a High School Annex into an Independent National High School: Tanglagan National High School
2016-07-17	10875	Establishing a National Science and Technology High School: Antipolo City National Science and Technology High School
2016-07-17	10876	Converting a High School Annex into an Independent National High School: Tinglayan National High School
2016-07-17	10877	Converting a High School Annex into an Independent National High School: Inil U. Taha National High School
2016-07-17	10878	Amending the Agricultural Land Reform Code or RA 3844: Institutionalizing Direct Credit Support of the Land Bank of the Philippines to Agrarian Reform Beneficiaries, Small Farmers, and Fisherfolk
2016-07-17	10879	MIMAROPA Act
2016-07-17	10880	Creating an additional Branch of the Regional Trial Court
2016-07-17	10881	Amending Investment Restrictions in Specific Laws Governing Adjustment Companies, Lending Companies, Financing Companies, and Investment Houses
2016-07-17	10882	Amending the AFP Military Personnel Retirement and Separation Decree of 1979 or PD 1638: AFP Derivative Retirement Pension for Children/Survivors Act of 2016
2016-07-17	10883	New Anti-Carnapping Act of 2016
2016-07-17	10884	Amending the Urban Development and Housing Act of 1992 of RA 7279: Balanced Housing Development Program Amendments Act
2016-07-17	10885	Radio and Television Broadcasting Franchise: Makining Network, Inc
2016-07-17	10886	Radio and Television Broadcasting Franchise Renewal: Kalayaan Broadcasting System, Inc
2016-07-17	10887	Radio and Television Broadcasting Franchise Renewal: Byers Communications, Inc
2016-07-17	10888	Radio and Television Broadcasting Franchise Renewal: Zoe Broadcasting, Inc
2016-07-17	10889	Telecommunications Franchise Renewal: Corona International, Inc
2016-07-17	10890	Electric Power Distribution Franchise: Mactan Electric Company, Inc (MECO)
2016-07-21	10891	Electric Power Distribution Franchise: First Bay Power Corp. (FBPC)
2016-07-21	10892	Electric Power Distribution Franchise Renewal: Ibaan Electric Corporation
2016-07-21	10893	Radio and Television Broadcasting Franchise Renewal: Masbate Community Broadcasting Co., Inc.
2016-07-21	10894	Telecommunications Franchise Renewal: Philippine Telegraph and Telephone Corporation (PT&T)
2016-07-21	10895	Telecommunications Franchise: Avocado Broadband Telecoms, Inc.
2016-07-21	10896	Radio and Television Broadcasting Franchise Renewal: People's Broadcasting Service, Inc
2016-07-21	10897	Telecommunications Franchise: AMA Telecommunications, Inc
2016-07-21	10898	Telecommunications Franchise: Infinivan, Inc.
2016-07-21	10899	Radio and Television Broadcasting Franchise: Veritas Media Arts, Inc.
2016-07-21	10900	Telecommunications Franchise Renewal: Bell Telecommunication Philippines, Inc
2016-07-21	10901	Air Transport Franchise for Domestic and international Service: Pilipinas Asian Pearl Airways, Inc
2016-07-21	10902	Telecommunications Franchise: Metro Connections and Telecom Corp.
2016-07-21	10903	Telecommunications Franchise: Megamanila Telecom Corp.
2016-07-21	10904	Radio and Television Broadcasting Franchise: Pilipinas Radio Waves Corp
2016-07-21	10905	Closed Captions Requirement in Television on Television Stations and Television Programs Producers
2016-07-21	10906	Anti-Mail Order Spouse Act: Repealing the Anti-Mail Order Bride Act or RA 6955
2016-07-21	10907	Camiguin Tourism Development Act
2016-07-21	10908	Integrated History Act of 2016
2016-07-21	10909	No Shortchanging Act of 2016
2016-07-21	10910	Amending the Anti-Graft and Corrupt Practices Act: Increasing the Prescriptive Period for Violations of the Act from 15 Years to 20 Years
2016-07-21	10911	Anti-Age Discrimination in Employment Act
2016-07-21	10912	Continuing Professional Development Act of 2016
2016-07-21	10913	Anti-Distracted Driving Act
2016-07-21	10914	Granting Citizenship to a Person
2016-07-21	10915	Philippine Agricultural and Biosystems Engineering Act of 2016
2016-07-21	10916	Road Speed Limiter Act of 2016
2016-07-21	10917	Amending RA 9547 amendments to the Special Program for Employment of Students Actor RA 7323
2016-07-21	10918	Philippine Pharmacy Act: Repealing the Pharmacy Act or RA 5921
2016-07-21	10919	University of Science and Technology of Southern Philippines (USTSP) Act
2016-07-21	10920	Converting a High School Annex into an Independent National High School: Cupis National High School
2016-07-21	10921	Converting a High School Annex into an Independent National High School: Ili National High School
2016-07-22	10922	Economic and Financial Literacy Act
2016-10-15	10923	Amending the Synchronized Barangay and Sangguniang Kabataan Elections Act or RA 9164: Postponing the October 2016 Barangay and Sangguniang Kabataan Elections (spent)
2016-12-22	10924	Appropriations Act of 2017

=== 2015 (10653–10739) ===
Date approved	RA number	Title/category
2015-02-12	10653	Amending the National Internal Revenue Code of 1997 or RA 8424: Adjusting the 13th Month Pay and Other Benefits Ceiling
2015-02-27	10654	Amending the Philippine Fisheries Code of 1998 or RA 8550: Adopting the Precautionary Principle and Ecosystem-Based Approach
2015-03-13	10655	Amending the Revised Penal Code or Act No. 3815: Repealing the Crime of Premature Marriage
2015-03-25	10656	Amending the Synchronized Barangay and Sangguniang Kabataan Elections Act or RA 9164: Postponing the Sangguniang Kabataan Elections (spent)
2015-03-27	10657	Chemistry Profession Act: Repealing the Chemistry Act of the Philippines or RA 754
2015-03-27	10658	Creating a Legislative District: Lone District of the City of Biñan
2015-03-27	10659	Sugarcane Industry Development Act of 2015
2015-04-16	10660	Amending PD 1606: Further Strengthening the Organization of the Sandiganbayan
2015-05-29	10661	National Children's Month Act: November
2015-07-03	10662	Renaming a Road: Senator Benigno S. Aquino Jr. Avenue
2015-07-03	10663	Renaming a Road: President Corazon C. Aquino Avenue
2015-07-06	10664	Armed Forces of the Filipino People Week: Last Full Week of August
2015-07-09	10665	Open High School System Act
2015-07-21	10666	Children's Safety on Motorcycles Act of 2015
2015-07-21	10667	Philippine Competition Act
2015-07-21	10668	An Act Allowing Foreign Vessels to Transport and Co-Load Foreign Cargoes for Domestic Transshipment and For Other Purposes
2015-08-18	10669	Jesse Robredo Day: August 18
2015-08-20	10670	Renaming a Road: Gov. Benjamin "Kokoy" T. Romualdez Diversion Road
2015-08-19	10671	Renaming a Hospital: Salvador R. Encinas District Hospital
2015-08-19	10672	Granting Citizenship to a Person: Farrell Eldrian Wu
2015-08-19	10673	Reapportioning Legislative Districts of a Province
2015-08-19	10674	Establishing a Sports Center: Davao Del Norte Regional Sports Academy
2015-08-19	10675	Converting a Municipality into a Component City
2015-08-26	10676	Student-Athletes Protection Act
2015-08-26	10677	Increasing Bed Capacity of a Hospital: Northern Mindanao Medical Center
2015-08-26	10678	Amending RA 7179: Converting the Davao Regional Hospital into Davo Regional Medical Center
2015-08-27	10679	Youth Entrepreneurship Act
2015-08-27	10680	Establishing a Sports Center: Misamis Occidental Sports Academy
2015-08-27	10681	Establishing a Sports Center: Talisay Sports Academy and Training Center
2015-08-27	10682	Establishing a Sports Center: Alfonso Sports Academy and Training Center
2015-09-18	10683	Establishing a Sports Center: Siargao Island Sports Academy and Training Center
2015-09-18	10684	Creating an Additional Legislative District
2015-09-28	10685	Granting Citizenship to a Person: Peter Leslie Wallace
2015-10-11	10686	Creating a Registry of Deeds
2015-10-15	10687	Unified Student Financial Assistance System for Tertiary Education (UniFAST) Act
2015-10-20	10688	Metallurgical Engineering Act of 2015: Repealing the Metallurgical Engineering Act of the Philippines or PD 1536
2015-10-23	10689	National Indigenous Peoples Day: August 9
2015-10-23	10690	The Forestry Profession Act: Repealing the Forestry Profession Act or RA 6239
2015-10-26	10691	Amending the Public Employment Service Office Act of 1999 or RA 8759
2015-11-03	10692	The Philippine Atmospheric, Geophysical, and Astronomical Services Administration (PAGASA) Modernization Act
2015-11-03	10693	Microfinance NGOs Act
2015-11-11	10694	Creating additional Branches of the Municipal Trial Court
2015-11-11	10695	Creating an additional Branch of the Regional Trial Court
2015-11-11	10696	Creating additional Branches of the Regional Trial Court and the Municipal Trial Court
2015-11-13	10697	Strategic Trade Management Act (STMA)
2015-11-13	10698	Naval Architecture Act
2015-11-13	10699	National Athletes and Coaches Benefits and Incentives Act: Repealing RA 9064
2015-11-20	10700	Creating additional Branches of the Regional Trial Court
2015-11-20	10701	Creating additional Branches of the Regional Trial Court
2015-11-20	10702	Creating additional Branches of the Regional Trial Court
2015-11-20	10703	Creating additional Branches of the Regional Trial Court
2015-11-20	10704	Creating additional Branches of the Regional Trial Court
2015-11-20	10705	Converting a Municipal Circuit Trial Court into a Municipal Trial Court
2015-11-26	10706	Seafarers Protection Act
2015-11-26	10707	Amending the Probation Act of 1976 or PD 968
2015-12-09	10708	The Tax Incentives Management and Transparency Act (TIMTA)
2015-12-09	10709	Annual Thirty Day Leave Privileges for First Level Courts' Judges
2015-12-09	10710	Creating additional Branches of the Regional Trial Court
2015-12-09	10711	Creating additional Branches of the Regional Trial Court and the Metropolitan Trial Court
2015-12-09	10712	Creating additional Branches of the Regional Trial Court
2015-12-09	10713	Creating additional Branches of the Regional Trial Court
2015-12-09	10714	Creating additional Branches of the Regional Trial Court
2015-12-09	10715	Creating additional Branches of the Regional Trial Court
2015-12-10	10716	Changing the Name of a National High School: Corazon C. Aquino National High School
2015-12-10	10717	Appropriations Act of 2016
2015-12-29	10718	Converting a High School Annex into an Independent National High School: Balbalan National High School
2015-12-29	10719	Converting a High School Annex into an Independent National High School: Abuyo National High School
2015-12-29	10720	Converting a High School Annex into an Independent National High School: Consuelo National High School
2015-12-29	10721	Converting a High School Annex into an Independent National High School: Palandok National High School
2015-12-29	10722	Converting a High School Annex into an Independent National High School: Colongulo National High School
2015-12-29	10723	Converting a High School Annex into an Independent National High School: Tumog National Agricultural and Trade High School
2015-12-29	10724	Converting a High School Annex into an Independent National High School: Santa Fe National High School
2015-12-29	10725	Converting a High School Annex into an Independent National High School: Kabugao National High School
2015-12-29	10726	Converting a High School Annex into an Independent National High School: General Licerio Topacio National High School
2015-12-29	10727	Converting a High School Annex into an Independent National High School: Saint Peter National High School
2015-12-29	10728	Converting a High School Annex into an Independent National High School: Tabuan National High School
2015-12-29	10729	Converting a High School Annex into an Independent National High School: Daniel C. Mantos National High School
2015-12-29	10730	Establishing a National High School: Maria Clara Lobregat National High School
2015-12-29	10731	Establishing a National High School: Libagon National High School
2015-12-29	10732	Establishing a National Science High School: Navotas National Science High School
2015-12-29	10733	Converting an Elementary School into an Integrated School: Andres Bonifacio Integrated School
2015-12-29	10734	Converting a High School Annex into an Independent National High School: Tinuyop National High School
2015-12-29	10735	Converting a High School Annex into an Independent National High School: Talinga National High School
2015-12-29	10736	Converting a High School Annex into an Independent National High School: Little Baguio National High School
2015-12-29	10737	Converting a High School Annex into an Independent National High School: Santa Filomena School of Arts and Trades
2015-12-29	10738	Converting a High School Annex into an Independent National High School: Buloron National High School
2015-12-29	10739	Creating additional Branches of the Regional Trial Court

=== 2014 (10635–10652) ===
Date approved	RA number	Title/category
2014-03-16	10635	Establishing the Maritime Industry Authority (MARINA) as solely responsible for the 1978 STCW Convention
2014-06-16	10636	Granting Citizenship to a Person: Andray Blatche
2014-06-16	10637	Electric Power Distribution Franchise: Cotabato Light and Power Company
2014-06-16	10638	Amending the Philippine National Railways Act or RA 4156: Extending the Life of the PNR
2014-06-20	10639	Free Mobile Disaster Alerts Act
2014-07-15	10640	Amending the Comprehensive Dangerous Drugs Act or RA 9165: Strengthening the Anti-Drug Campaign
2014-07-15	10641	Amending RA 7721: Allowing Full Entry of Foreign Banks
2014-07-15	10642	Philippine Lemon Act
2014-07-15	10643	Graphic Health Warnings Act
2014-07-15	10644	Go Negosyo Act
2014-11-05	10645	Amending RA 7432: Mandatory PHILHEALTH Coverage for All Senior Citizens
2014-11-08	10646	Creating a Government-Owned or -Controlled Corporation: Charter of the Quezon City Development Authority
2014-11-21	10647	Ladderized Education Act of 2014
2014-11-27	10648	Iskolar ng Bayan Act of 2014
2014-11-27	10649	Amending RA 6948: Increasing the Burial Assistance for Military Veterans
2014-12-09	10650	Open Distance Learning Act
2014-12-29	10651	General Appropriations Act
2014-12-23	10652	Supplemental Appropriations Act of 2014

=== 2013 (10355–10634) ===
Date approved	RA number	Title/category
2013-01-09	10355	Increasing Bed Capacity of a Hospital
2013-01-09	10356	Granting Citizenship to a Person: Jessie Josephine Coe Lichauco
2013-01-09	10357	Declaring Every September 5 a Special Working Holiday in Naga City in Commemoration of its Foundation
2013-01-09	10358	Declaring Every July 7 a Special Working Holiday in Carcar City in Commemoration of its Foundation
2013-01-09	10359	Declaring Every March 26 a Special Working Holiday in Cebu Province in Commemoration of its Liberation from Japanese Occupation
2013-01-09	10360	Creating a Province
2013-01-18	10361	Domestic Workers Act
2013-01-23	10362	Creating additional Branches of the Regional Trial Court
2013-01-28	10363	Creating additional Branches of the Regional Trial Court
2013-02-06	10364	Expanded Anti-Trafficking in Persons Act of 2012
2013-02-15	10365	Amending the Anti-Money Laundering Act or R.A. 9160
2013-02-15	10366	COMELEC on Precincts for PWD and Senior Citizens
2013-02-15	10367	Mandatory Biometrics in Voter Registration
2013-02-25	10368	Reparation and Recognition of Victims of Human Rights Violations During the Marcos Regime
2013-02-28	10369	Reconstituting a District Engineering Office into Two District Offices
2013-02-28	10370	Establishing a Municipal Circuit Trial Court
2013-02-28	10371	Creating an additional Branch of the Regional Trial Court
2013-02-28	10372	Amending the Intellectual Property Code or RA 8293
2013-03-01	10373	Electric Power Distribution Franchise: Olongapo Electricity Distribution Company, Inc.
2013-03-05	10374	Amending the Agricultural Land Reform Code or RA 3844: Extending the Life of the Land Bank of the Philippines
2013-03-05	10375	Converting a Road into National Road
2013-03-05	10376	Zamboanga Del Norte Electric Cooperative, Inc – Condoning Interest Payable to National Power Corporation
2013-03-05	10377	Transferring Location of a District Engineering Office
2013-03-07	10378	Amending the National Internal Revenue Code of 1997 or RA 8424: Recognizing the Principle of Reciprocity on Income Tax Exemptions to International Carriers
2013-03-08	10379	Establishing a District Engineering Office
2013-03-14	10380	Local Absentee Voting for Media
2013-03-14	10381	Creating additional Branches of the Metropolitan Trial Court
2013-03-14	10382	Converting a Road into National Road
2013-03-14	10383	Converting a Road into National Road
2013-03-14	10384	Converting a Road into National Road
2013-03-14	10385	Converting a Road into National Road
2013-03-14	10386	Converting a Road into National Road
2013-03-14	10387	Converting a Road into National Road
2013-03-14	10388	Converting an Extension Office into a Regular Office (LTO)
2013-03-14	10389	Recognizance Act of 2012
2013-03-14	10390	Amending RA 7306: Revitalizing the People's Television Network, Inc Act
2013-03-14	10391	Converting an Extension Office into a Regular Office (LTO)
2013-03-14	10392	Creating additional Branches of the Regional Trial Court
2013-03-14	10393	Creating additional Branches of the Regional Trial Court
2013-03-14	10394	Converting Branches of the Regional Trial Court of Pasig City into the Regional Trial Court of Taguig City
2013-03-14	10395	Amending the Labor Code or PD 442: Strengthening Tripartism
2013-03-14	10396	Amending the Labor Code or PD 442: Strengthening Conciliation-Mediation
2013-03-16	10397	Converting a Provincial Road to National Road
2013-03-19	10398	Declaring Every November 25 as the "National Consciousness Day for the Elimination of Violence Against Women and Children"
2013-03-19	10399	Converting a Road into National Road
2013-03-19	10400	Converting a Road into National Road
2013-03-19	10401	Converting a Road into National Road
2013-03-19	10402	Converting a Provincial Road to National Road
2013-03-19	10403	Converting a Road into National Road
2013-03-19	10404	Converting a Road into National Road
2013-03-19	10405	Converting a Road into National Road
2013-03-19	10406	Converting a Provincial Road to National Road
2013-03-19	10407	Converting a Provincial Road to National Road
2013-03-19	10408	Converting a Road into National Road
2013-03-19	10409	A Tourism Development Area
2013-03-26	10410	Early Years Act of 2013
2013-03-26	10411	Converting a Road into National Road
2013-03-26	10412	Converting a Provincial Road to National Road
2013-03-26	10413	Converting a Road into National Road
2013-03-26	10414	Converting a Road into National Road
2013-03-26	10415	Converting a Road into National Road
2013-03-26	10416	Converting a Road into National Road
2013-03-26	10417	Converting a Road into National Road
2013-03-26	10418	Converting a Road into National Road
2013-03-26	10419	Converting a Road into National Road
2013-03-26	10420	Converting a Municipality into a Component City
2013-04-08	10421	Establishing a National High School
2013-04-08	10422	Converting a High School Annex into an Independent National High School
2013-04-08	10423	Converting a High School Annex into an Independent National High School
2013-04-08	10424	Converting a High School Annex into an Independent National High School
2013-04-08	10425	Converting a High School Annex into an Independent National High School
2013-04-08	10426	Establishing a National High School
2013-04-08	10427	Establishing a Primary School
2013-04-08	10428	Converting a High School Annex into an Independent National High School
2013-04-08	10429	Converting a High School Annex into an Independent National High School
2013-04-08	10430	Converting a High School Annex into an Independent National High School
2013-04-08	10431	Converting a High School Annex into an Independent National High School
2013-04-08	10432	Converting a High School Annex into an Independent National High School
2013-04-08	10433	Converting a High School Annex into an Independent National High School
2013-04-08	10434	Establishing a National High School
2013-04-08	10435	Converting a High School Annex into an Independent National High School
2013-04-08	10436	Converting a High School Annex into an Independent National High School
2013-04-08	10437	Establishing a National High School
2013-04-08	10438	Converting a High School Annex into an Independent National High School
2013-04-08	10439	Changing the Name of a National High School
2013-04-08	10440	Converting a High School into a National High School
2013-04-08	10441	Converting a High School Annex into an Independent National High School
2013-04-08	10442	Converting a High School Annex into an Independent National High School
2013-04-08	10443	Converting a High School Annex into an Independent National High School
2013-04-08	10444	Converting a High School Annex into an Independent National High School
2013-04-08	10445	Converting a High School Annex into an Independent National High School
2013-04-08	10446	Converting a High School Annex into an Independent National High School
2013-04-08	10447	Converting a High School Annex into an Independent National High School
2013-04-08	10448	Converting a High School Annex into an Independent National High School
2013-04-08	10449	Converting a High School Annex into an Independent National High School
2013-04-08	10450	Converting a High School Annex into an Independent National High School
2013-04-08	10451	Establishing the Bikol Botanical Garden
2013-04-08	10452	Reforesting 3,000 Hectares of Public Land
2013-04-08	10453	Converting a Road into National Road
2013-04-08	10454	Creating additional Branches to the Regional Trial Court and the Municipal Trial Court
2013-04-08	10455	Establishing a National High School
2013-04-11	10456	Establishing a Separate City Schools Division Office
2013-04-11	10457	Converting a Road into National Road
2013-04-16	10458	Establishing a National High School
2013-04-16	10459	Establishing a National High School
2013-04-16	10460	Establishing a Primary School
2013-04-16	10461	Establishing a National High School
2013-04-16	10462	Establishing a National High School
2013-04-16	10463	Converting a High School Annex into an Independent National High School
2013-04-16	10464	Establishing a National High School
2013-04-16	10465	Converting a High School Annex into an Independent National High School
2013-04-16	10466	Converting a High School Annex into a National Science High School
2013-04-16	10467	Establishing a National High School
2013-04-16	10468	Establishing a National High School
2013-04-16	10469	Establishing a National High School
2013-04-16	10470	Converting a High School Annex into an Independent National High School
2013-04-16	10471	Changing the Name of a National High School
2013-04-16	10472	Changing the Name of a National High School
2013-04-16	10473	Converting a High School Annex into an Independent National High School
2013-04-16	10474	Converting a High School Annex into an Independent National High School
2013-04-16	10475	Converting a High School Annex into an Independent National High School
2013-04-16	10476	Converting a High School Annex into an Independent National High School
2013-04-16	10477	Converting a High School Annex into an Independent National High School
2013-04-16	10478	Converting a High School Annex into an Independent National High School
2013-04-16	10479	Converting a High School Annex into an Independent National High School
2013-04-16	10480	Creating additional Branches of the Metropolitan Trial Court
2013-04-16	10481	Establishing a National High School
2013-04-16	10482	Establishing a National High School
2013-04-16	10483	Establishing a Primary School
2013-04-16	10484	Converting a High School Annex into an Independent National High School
2013-04-16	10485	Converting a High School Annex into an Independent National High School
2013-04-16	10486	Converting a High School Annex into an Independent National High School
2013-04-16	10487	Converting a High School Annex into an Independent National High School
2013-04-16	10488	Converting a High School Annex into an Independent National High School
2013-04-16	10489	Converting a High School Annex into an Independent National High School
2013-04-16	10490	Establishing a National High School
2013-04-16	10491	Converting a High School Annex into an Independent National High School
2013-04-16	10492	Converting a High School Annex into an Independent National High School
2013-04-16	10493	Converting a High School Annex into an Independent National High School
2013-04-16	10494	Converting a High School Annex into an Independent National High School
2013-04-16	10495	Establishing a National High School
2013-04-16	10496	Converting a High School Annex into an Independent National High School
2013-04-16	10497	Establishing a National High School
2013-04-16	10498	Converting a High School Annex into an Independent National High School
2013-04-16	10499	Establishing a National High School
2013-04-16	10500	Converting a High School Annex into an Independent National High School
2013-04-16	10501	Establishing a National High School
2013-04-16	10502	Converting a High School Annex into an Independent National High School
2013-04-16	10503	Converting a High School Annex into an Independent National High School
2013-04-16	10504	Converting a High School Annex into an Independent National High School
2013-04-16	10505	Converting a High School Annex into an Independent National High School
2013-04-16	10506	Converting a High School Annex into an Independent National High School
2013-04-16	10507	Changing the Name of a National High School
2013-04-16	10508	Changing the Name of an Elementary School
2013-04-16	10509	Converting a High School Annex into an Independent National High School
2013-04-16	10510	Converting a High School Annex into an Independent National High School
2013-04-16	10511	Converting a High School Annex into an Independent National High School
2013-04-16	10512	Converting a High School Annex into an Independent National High School
2013-04-16	10513	Converting a High School Annex into an Independent National High School
2013-04-16	10514	Establishing a City Schools Division Office
2013-04-17	10515	Anti-Cable Television and Cable Internet Tapping Act of 2013
2013-04-17	10516	Expanding Utilization of an Industrial Estate
2013-04-23	10517	Creating additional Branches of the Regional Trial Court
2013-04-23	10518	Creating additional Branches of the Regional Trial Court
2013-04-23	10519	Creating additional Branches of the Regional Trial Court
2013-04-23	10520	Creating additional Branches of the Metropolitan Trial Court and the Regional Trial Court
2013-04-23	10521	Creating additional Branches of the Regional Trial Court
2013-04-23	10522	Creating additional Branches of the Metropolitan Trial Court
2013-04-23	10523	Creating an additional Branch of the Regional Trial Court
2013-04-23	10524	Amending the Magna Carta for PWD or RA 7277
2013-04-23	10525	Declaring the First Week of February of Each Year as "World Interfaith Harmony Week"
2013-04-23	10526	Declaring the Month of January of Each Year as "Liver Cancer and Viral Hepatitis Awareness and Prevention Month"
2013-05-07	10527	Converting an Elementary School into an Integrated School
2013-05-07	10528	Converting an Extension Office into a Regular Office of the LTO
2013-05-07	10529	Renaming a Regional Office of the PNP
2013-05-07	10530	The Red Cross and Other Emblems Act of 2013
2013-05-07	10531	Amending the National Electrification Administration Decree or PD 269
2013-05-07	10532	Philippine National Health Research System Act of 2013
2013-05-15	10533	Enhanced Basic Education Act of 2013
2013-05-15	10534	Renaming a Provincial Office of the PNP
2013-05-15	10535	Philippine Standard Time Act of 2013
2013-05-15	10536	Amending the Meat Inspection Code or RA 9296
2013-05-15	10537	Creating additional Branches of the Metropolitan Trial Court
2013-05-15	10538	Creating an additional Branch of the Regional Trial Court
2013-05-15	10539	Creating additional Branches of the Regional Trial Court
2013-05-15	10540	Creating additional Branches of the Regional Trial Court
2013-05-15	10541	Creating an additional Branch of the Regional Trial Court
2013-05-15	10542	Creating an additional Branch of the Regional Trial Court
2013-05-15	10543	Creating an additional Branch of the Regional Trial Court
2013-05-15	10544	Creating additional Branches of the Regional Trial Court
2013-05-15	10545	Creating additional Branches of the Regional Trial Court
2013-05-15	10546	Creating an additional Branch of the Regional Trial Court
2013-05-15	10547	Creating additional Branches of the Regional Trial Court
2013-05-15	10548	Converting a Road into National Road
2013-05-15	10549	Converting a Provincial Road to National Road
2013-05-15	10550	Converting a Provincial Road to National Road
2013-05-15	10551	Converting a Provincial Road to National Road
2013-05-15	10552	Converting a Road into National Road
2013-05-15	10553	Converting a Road into National Road
2013-05-15	10554	Establishing a City Schools Division Office
2013-05-15	10555	Declaring Places in the Municipality as Cultural Heritage Tourism Zone
2013-05-15	10556	Declaring Every November 27 a Regular Working Holiday as the "Araw ng Pagbasa"
2013-05-15	10557	Renaming the Product Development and Design Center of the Philippines into the Design Center of the Philippines
2013-05-15	10558	Increasing Plantilla Positions for the West Visayas State University and West Visayas State University Medical Center
2013-05-17	10559	Renaming a Provincial Office of the PNP
2013-05-17	10560	Declaring a Tourism Development Area
2013-05-17	10561	Declaring a Tourism Development Area
2013-05-22	10562	Creating additional Branches of the Regional Trial Court
2013-05-22	10563	Creating an additional Branch of the Regional Trial Court
2013-05-22	10564	Creating additional Branches of the Regional Trial Court
2013-05-22	10565	Creating an additional Branch of the Regional Trial Court
2013-05-22	10566	Creating additional Branches of the Metropolitan Trial Court
2013-05-22	10567	Creating an additional Branch of the Regional Trial Court
2013-05-22	10568	Creating an additional Branches of the Regional Trial Court and the Municipal Trial Court
2013-05-22	10569	Creating additional Branches of the Regional Trial Court
2013-05-22	10570	Creating additional Branches of the Regional Trial Court and the Municipal Trial Court
2013-05-22	10571	Creating an additional Branch of the Regional Trial Court
2013-05-24	10572	Amending the Family Code of the Philippines or EO 209: Establishing a Liability of the Absolute Community or Conjugal Partnership
2013-05-24	10573	Declaring a National Historical Landmark
2013-05-24	10574	Amending the Rural Bank Act of 1992 or RA 7353: Allowing Infusion of Foreign Equity
2013-05-24	10575	Bureau of Corrections Act of 2013
2013-05-24	10576	Creating an additional Branch of the Regional Trial Court
2013-05-24	10577	Creating additional Branches of the Regional Trial Court
2013-05-24	10578	Creating additional Branches of the Regional Trial Court and the Municipal Trial Court
2013-05-24	10579	Creating an additional Branch of the Regional Trial Court
2013-05-24	10580	Creating additional Branches of the Regional Trial Court
2013-05-24	10581	Creating additional Branches of the Regional Trial Court
2013-05-24	10582	Creating additional Branches of the Regional Trial Court
2013-05-24	10583	Converting a State College into a State University
2013-05-24	10584	Converting a State College into a State University
2013-05-24	10585	Converting a State College into a State University
2013-05-27	10586	Anti-Drunk and Drugged Driving Act of 2013
2013-05-27	10587	Environmental Planning Act of 2013: Repealing PD 1308
2013-05-27	10588	Palarong Pambansa Act of 2013
2013-05-24	10589	Declaring Every December of Every Year as "Anti-Corruption Month"
2013-05-27	10590	Overseas Voting Act of 2013: Amending RA 9189
2013-05-29	10591	Comprehensive Firearms and Ammunition Regulation Act
2013-05-29	10592	Amending the Revised Penal Code or Act 3815
2013-05-29	10593	Amending the Coconut Preservation Act of 1995 or RA 8048
2013-06-04	10594	Establishing a State College: Talisay City State College
2013-06-04	10595	Converting a State College into a State University: Iloilo Science and Technology University
2013-06-04	10596	Converting a State College into a State University: Mindoro State University (MINSU)
2013-06-04	10597	Integrating State Colleges into a State University: Northern Iloilo State University
2013-06-04	10598	Establishing a State College: Compostela Valley State College
2013-06-04	10599	Integrating State Colleges into a State University: Palompon Polytechnic State University
2013-06-04	10600	Integrating State Colleges into a State University: Surigao Del Norte State University
2013-06-05	10601	Agricultural and Fisheries Mechanization Act
2013-06-11	10602	Creating additional Branches of the Regional Trial Court
2013-06-11	10603	Creating additional Branches of the Regional Trial Court
2013-06-11	10604	Converting a State College into a State University
2013-06-11	10605	Converting a State College into a State University
2013-06-19	10606	Amending the National Health Insurance Act of 1995 or RA 7875: National Health Insurance Act of 2013
2013-08-15	10607	Amending the Insurance Code or PD 612
2013-08-22	10608	Creating additional Branches of the Regional Trial Court
2013-08-23	10609	Protection of Students' Right to Enroll in Review Centers Act of 2013
2013-08-23	10610	Construction of a Fish Port
2013-08-23	10611	Food Safety Act of 2013
2013-08-23	10612	Fast-Tracked S&T Scholarship Act of 2013
2013-08-28	10613	Increasing Bed Capacity of a Hospital
2013-08-28	10614	Increasing Bed Capacity of a Hospital
2013-08-28	10615	Construction of a Fish Port
2013-08-28	10616	Construction of a Fish Port
2013-08-28	10617	Construction of a Fish Port and Cold Storage Facility
2013-09-03	10618	Rural Farm Schools Act
2013-09-03	10619	Establishing a Municipal Hospital
2013-09-03	10620	Toy and Game Safety Labeling Act of 2013
2013-09-06	10621	Construction of a Fish Port and Cold Storage Facility
2013-09-06	10622	Changing the Name of an Agricultural School
2013-09-06	10623	Amending the Price Act or RA 7581
2013-09-06	10624	Construction of a Fish Port
2013-09-12	10625	Philippine Statistical Act of 2013: Repealing EO 121
2013-09-12	10626	Converting a Sub-District Engineering Office into a Regular Office
2013-09-12	10627	Anti-Bullying Act of 2013
2013-09-26	10628	Construction of Fish Ports
2013-09-26	10629	Amending the National Integrated Protected Areas System Act of 1992 or RA 7586
2013-10-03	10630	Amending the Juvenile Justice and Welfare Act 2006 or RA 9344
2013-10-03	10631	Amending the Animal Welfare Act of 1998 or RA 8485
2013-10-03	10632	Amending RA 9340: Postponement of Sangguniang Kabataan Elections (spent)
2013-12-16	10633	Appropriations Act of 2014
2013-12-26	10634	Supplemental Appropriations Act for 2013

=== 2012 (10157–10354) ===
Date approved	RA number	Title/category
2012-01-
2012-01-20	10157	Kindergarten Education Act
2012-03-27	10158	Amending the Revised Penal Code or Act 3815: Decriminalizing Vagrancy
2012-04-10	10159	Amending the Revised Penal Code or Act 3815
2012-04-10	10160	Converting a Municipality into a Component City
2012-04-10	10161	Converting a Municipality into a Component City
2012-04-17	10162	Creating additional Branches of the Regional Trial Court
2012-05-16	10163	Converting a Municipality into a Component City
2012-05-15	10164	Converting a Municipality into a Component City
2012-06-11	10165	Foster Care Act of 2012
2012-06-11	10166	Geology Profession Act of 2012: Repealing RA 4209
2012-06-06	10167	Amending the Anti-Money Laundering Act
2012-06-20	10168	Terrorism Financing Prevention and Suppression Act of 2012
2012-06-21	10169	Converting a Municipality into a Component City
2012-07-02	10170	Reapportioning Legislative Districts of Quezon City
2012-07-19	10171	Reapportioning Legislative Districts of a Province
2012-08-15	10172	Amending RA 9048: Correcting Typographical Errors in the Civil Register
2012-08-15	10173	Data Privacy Act of 2012
2012-08-16	10174	Amending the Climate Change Act of 2009: Establishing the People's Survival Fund
2012-09-12	10175	Cybercrime Prevention Act of 2012
2012-09-12	10176	Arbor Day Act of 2012
2012-09-14	10177	Reapportioning Legislative Districts of a Province
2012-09-21	10178	Radio and Television Broadcasting Franchise: Reliance Broadcasting Unlimited, Inc
2012-09-21	10179	Radio and Television Broadcasting Franchise
2012-09-21	10180	Radio and Television Broadcasting Franchise
2012-09-21	10181	Television Broadcasting Franchise: TV Maria Foundation Philippines, Inc
2012-09-21	10182	Telecommunications Franchise: Telecommunications Technology Solutions, Inc
2012-09-21	10183	Telecommunications Franchise: Wi-Trive Telecoms, Inc
2012-09-28	10184	Reapportioning Legislative Districts of a Province
2012-10-18	10185	Converting a High School Annex into an Independent National High School
2012-10-18	10186	Converting a High School Annex into an Independent National High School
2012-10-18	10187	Establishing a National High School
2012-10-18	10188	Establishing a National High School
2012-10-18	10189	Establishing a National High School
2012-10-18	10190	Converting a High School Annex into an Independent National High School
2012-10-18	10191	Converting a High School Annex into an Independent National High School
2012-10-18	10192	Converting a High School Annex into an Independent National High School
2012-10-18	10193	Converting a High School Annex into an Independent National High School
2012-10-18	10194	Converting a High School Annex into an Independent National High School
2012-10-18	10195	Establishing a National High School
2012-10-18	10196	Converting a High School Annex into an Independent National High School
2012-10-18	10197	Converting a High School into a National High School
2012-10-18	10198	Establishing a National High School
2012-10-18	10199	Converting a High School Annex into an Independent National High School
2012-10-18	10200	Converting a High School Annex into an Independent National High School
2012-10-18	10201	Establishing a National High School
2012-10-18	10202	Converting a High School Annex into an Independent National High School
2012-10-18	10203	Establishing a National High School
2012-10-18	10204	Converting a High School Annex into an Independent National High School
2012-10-18	10205	Converting a High School Annex into an Independent National High School
2012-10-18	10206	Converting a High School Annex into an Independent National High School
2012-10-18	10207	Converting a High School Annex into an Independent National High School
2012-10-18	10208	Converting a High School Annex into an Independent National High School
2012-10-18	10209	Converting a High School Annex into an Independent National High School
2012-10-18	10210	Establishing a National High School
2012-10-18	10211	Establishing a National High School
2012-10-18	10212	Converting a High School Annex into an Independent National High School
2012-10-18	10213	Converting a High School Annex into an Independent National High School
2012-10-18	10214	Converting a High School Annex into an Independent National High School
2012-10-18	10215	Establishing a National High School
2012-10-18	10216	Establishing a National High School
2012-10-18	10217	Converting a High School Annex into an Independent National High School
2012-10-18	10218	Establishing a National High School
2012-10-18	10219	Converting a High School Annex into an Independent National High School
2012-10-18	10220	Converting a High School Annex into an Independent National High School
2012-10-18	10221	Establishing a National High School
2012-10-18	10222	Converting a High School Annex into an Independent National High School
2012-10-18	10223	Establishing an Elementary School
2012-10-18	10224	Establishing a National High School
2012-10-18	10225	Converting a High School Annex into an Independent National High School
2012-10-18	10226	Converting a High School Annex into an Independent National High School
2012-10-18	10227	Renaming an Educational Institution
2012-10-18	10228	Converting a State College into a State University
2012-10-19	10229	Converting a State College into a State University
2012-10-19	10230	Integrating State Colleges into a State University
2012-10-19	10231	Converting a State College Campus into a Separate State College
2012-10-29	10232	Establishing a National High School
2012-10-29	10233	Converting a High School Annex into an Independent National High School
2012-10-29	10234	Establishing a National High School
2012-10-29	10235	Establishing a National High School
2012-10-29	10236	Converting a High School Annex into an Independent National High School
2012-10-29	10237	Converting a High School Annex into an Independent National High School
2012-10-29	10238	Converting a National High School into a National Science High School
2012-10-29	10239	Converting a High School Annex into an Independent National High School
2012-10-29	10240	Establishing a National High School
2012-10-29	10241	Converting a High School Annex into an Independent National High School
2012-10-29	10242	Converting a High School Annex into an Independent National High School
2012-11-08	10243	Creating additional Branches of the Regional Trial Court
2012-11-08	10244	Creating additional Branches of the Regional Trial Court
2012-11-08	10245	Creating additional Branches of the Regional Trial Court
2012-11-08	10246	Creating an additional Branch of the Regional Trial Court
2012-11-08	10247	Creating an additional Branch of the Regional Trial Court
2012-11-08	10248	Creating an additional Branch of the Regional Trial Court
2012-11-08	10249	Creating an additional Branch of the Regional Trial Court
2012-11-08	10250	Creating additional Branches of the Regional Trial Court
2012-11-08	10251	Creating additional Branches of the Metropolitan Trial Court
2012-11-08	10252	Creating additional Branches of the Regional Trial Court
2012-11-08	10253	Creating additional Branches of the Municipal Trial Court
2012-11-08	10254	Creating additional Branches of the Municipal Trial Court
2012-11-15	10255	Establishing a National High School
2012-11-15	10256	Establishing a National High School
2012-11-15	10257	Establishing a National High School
2012-11-15	10258	Converting a High School Annex into an Independent National High School
2012-11-15	10259	Converting a High School Annex into an Independent National High School
2012-11-15	10260	Converting a High School Annex into an Independent National High School
2012-11-15	10261	Converting a High School Annex into an Independent National High School
2012-11-15	10262	Converting a High School Annex into an Independent National High School
2012-11-15	10263	Converting a High School Annex into an Independent National High School
2012-11-15	10264	Converting a High School Annex into an Independent National High School
2012-11-15	10265	Establishing a National High School
2012-11-15	10266	Establishing a National High School
2012-11-15	10267	Converting a National High School into a Regional Science High School
2012-11-15	10268	Establishing a National High School
2012-11-15	10269	Establishing a National High School
2012-11-15	10270	Establishing a National High School
2012-11-15	10271	Converting a High School Annex into an Independent National High School
2012-11-15	10272	Converting a High School Annex into an Independent National High School
2012-11-15	10273	Converting a High School Annex into an Independent National High School
2012-11-15	10274	Converting a High School Annex into an Independent National High School
2012-11-15	10275	Converting a High School Annex into an Independent National High School
2012-11-15	10276	Establishing a National High School
2012-11-15	10277	Converting a High School Annex into an Independent National High School
2012-11-15	10278	Converting a High School Annex into an Independent National High School
2012-11-15	10279	Converting a High School Annex into an Independent National High School
2012-11-15	10280	Changing the Name of a National High School
2012-11-15	10281	Changing the Name of an Elementary School
2012-11-15	10282	Establishing a High School Annex
2012-11-15	10283	Changing the Name of a National High School
2012-11-14	10284	Establishing a National Science High School
2012-11-14	10285	Converting a High School Annex into an Independent National High School
2012-11-14	10286	Converting a High School Annex into an Independent National High School
2012-11-14	10287	Converting a High School Annex into an Independent National High School
2012-11-14	10288	Converting a High School Annex into an Independent National High School
2012-11-14	10289	Converting a High School Annex into an Independent National High School
2012-11-14	10290	Establishing a National High School
2012-11-14	10291	Establishing an Integrated School
2012-11-14	10292	Establishing a National High School
2012-11-14	10293	Converting a High School Annex into an Independent National High School
2012-11-14	10294	Converting a High School Annex into an Independent National High School
2012-11-14	10295	Converting a High School Annex into an Independent National High School
2012-11-14	10296	Converting a High School Annex into an Independent National High School
2012-11-14	10297	Converting a High School Annex into an Independent National High School
2012-11-15	10298	Creating an additional Branch of the Regional Trial Court
2012-11-15	10299	Creating additional Branches of the Regional Trial Court and the Metropolitan Trial Court
2012-11-15	10300	Creating an additional Branch of the Regional Trial Court
2012-11-15	10301	Creating additional Branches of the Regional Trial Court
2012-11-15	10302	Creating additional Branches of the Regional Trial Court
2012-11-15	10303	Creating additional Branches of the Regional Trial Court
2012-11-15	10304	Converting an Elementary School into an Integrated School
2012-11-15	10305	Converting a High School Annex into an Independent National High School
2012-11-15	10306	Establishing an Integrated School
2012-11-15	10307	Establishing a National High School
2012-11-15	10308	Converting a High School into a National High School
2012-11-15	10309	Establishing a National High School
2012-11-15	10310	Establishing a National High School
2012-11-15	10311	Establishing a National High School
2012-11-15	10312	Converting a National High School into a National Vocational High School
2012-11-15	10313	Establishing a National High School
2012-11-15	10314	Establishing a National High School
2012-11-15	10315	Establishing a National High School
2012-11-15	10316	Converting a High School Annex into an Independent National High School
2012-11-15	10317	Converting a High School Annex into an Independent National High School
2012-11-15	10318	Converting a High School Annex into an Independent National High School
2012-11-15	10319	Establishing a High School Annex
2012-11-15	10320	Converting a High School Annex into an Independent National High School
2012-11-15	10321	Establishing a National High School
2012-11-15	10322	Establishing a High School Annex
2012-11-15	10323	Converting a High School Annex into an Independent National High School
2012-11-15	10324	Converting a High School Annex into an Independent National High School
2012-11-15	10325	Converting a High School Annex into an Independent National High School
2012-11-15	10326	Converting a High School Annex into an Independent National High School
2012-11-15	10327	Converting a High School Annex into an Independent National High School
2012-11-15	10328	Converting a High School Annex into an Independent National High School: Mantalisay National High School
2012-11-15	10329	Converting a High School Annex into an Independent National High School
2012-11-15	10330	Converting a High School Annex into an Independent National High School: Pinamasagan National High School
2012-11-15	10331	Converting a High School Annex into an Independent National High School: Gubaan National High School
2012-11-15	10332	Converting a High School Annex into an Independent National High School
2012-11-15	10333	Changing the Name of a National High School
2012-11-15	10334	Converting a High School Annex into an Independent National High School
2012-11-15	10335	Establishing an Elementary School
2012-11-15	10336	Establishing an Integrated School
2012-11-21	10337	Converting an Extension Office into a Regular Office (LTO)
2012-11-21	10338	Converting an Extension Office into a Regular Office (LTO)
2012-11-21	10339	Creating additional Branches of the Regional Trial Court
2012-11-21	10340	Creating additional Branches of the Regional Trial Court
2012-11-21	10341	Creating additional Branches of the Regional Trial Court and the Metropolitan Trial Court
2012-12-04	10342	Radio Broadcasting Franchise: Quest Broadcasting, Inc
2012-12-04	10343	Telecommunications Franchise: Philippine Global Communications, Inc
2012-12-04	10344	Risk Reduction and Preparedness Equipment Protection Act
2012-12-04	10345	Increasing Bed Capacity of a Hospital
2012-12-04	10346	Converting an Extension Office into a Regular Office (LTO)
2012-12-04	10347	Converting an Extension Office into a Regular Office (LTO)
2012-12-06	10348	Creating additional Branches of the Regional Trial Court
2012-12-11	10349	Amending the AFP Modernization Act or RA 7898
2012-12-17	10350	Philippine Interior Design Act of 2012: Repealing RA 8534
2012-12-19	10351	Amending the National Internal Revenue Code of 1997 or RA 8424: Restructuring the Excise Tax on Alcohol and Tobacco Products
2012-12-19	10352	Appropriations Act of 2013
2012-12-21	10353	Anti-Enforced or Involuntary Disappearance Act of 2012
2012-12-21	10354	Responsible Parenthood and Reproductive Health Act of 2012

=== 2011 (10148–10156) ===
Date approved	RA number	Title/category
2011-03-12	10148	Granting Citizenship to a Person
2011-06-06	10149	GOCC Governance Act of 2011
2011-06-21	10150	Amending the Electric Power Industry Reform Act of 2001: Lifeline Rate Implementation
2011-06-21	10151	Amending the Labor Code or PD 442: Allowing Employment of Night Workers
2011-06-21	10152	Mandatory Infants and Children Health Immunization Act of 2011: Repealing PD 996
2011-06-30	10153	Synchronization of ARMM Elections with the National and Local Elections
2011-07-14	10154	Early Release of Retirement Benefits for Retiring Government Employees
2011-12-	10155	Appropriations Act of 2012
2011-12-20	10156	Conferment of Civil Service Eligibility to Qualifying Members of the Sangguniangs Bayan, Panlungsod, and Panlalawigan

=== 2010 (9903–10146) ===
Date approved	RA number	Title/category
2010-01-07	9903	Social Security Condonation Act of 2009
2010-01-07	9904	Magna Carta for Homeowners and Homeowners' Associations
2010-01-07	9905	Creating a Barangay: Banawa-Englis (Rejected by Plebiscite)
2010-01-07	9906	Creating additional Branches of the Regional Trial Court
2010-01-07	9907	Establishing a National Science High School: Baguio City National Science High School
2010-01-07	9908	Converting a High School Annex into an Independent National High School: Mongilit Ligmayo National High School
2010-01-07	9909	Converting a High School Annex into an Independent National High School: Mabuhay National High School
2010-01-07	9910	Converting a High School Annex into an Independent National High School: Eastern Kalinga National High School
2010-01-07	9911	Converting a High School Annex into an Independent National High School: Nambucayan National High School
2010-01-07	9912	Converting a High School Annex into an Independent National High School: Langgawisan National High School
2010-01-07	9913	Converting a High School Annex into an Independent National High School: La Libertad National High School
2010-01-07	9914	Converting a High School Annex into an Independent National High School: Nieves Villarica National High School
2010-01-07	9915	Converting a High School Annex into an Independent National High School: Balili National High School
2010-01-07	9916	Converting a High School Annex into an Independent National High School: Tacadang National High School
2010-01-07	9917	Converting a High School Annex into an Independent National High School: Macutay-Palao National High School
2010-01-07	9918	Converting a High School Annex into an Independent National High School: Guisad Valley National High School
2010-01-07	9919	Converting a High School Annex into an Independent National High School: Marc Ysrael B. Bernos Memorial National High School
2010-01-07	9920	Converting a High School Annex into an Independent National High School: Ticulon National High School
2010-01-07	9921	Converting a National High School into a National Science High School: RPMD National Science High School
2010-01-07	9922	Separating Secondary Programs of a School into an Independent National High School: Buenavista National High School
2010-01-07	9923	Converting a Barangay High School into a National High School: Danao National High School
2010-01-07	9924	Establishing a National High School: Argao National High School
2010-01-07	9925	Establishing a National High School: Panlaitan National High School
2010-01-07	9926	Converting a High School Annex into an Independent National High School: San Jose National High School
2010-01-07	9927	Converting a High School Annex into an Independent National High School: Tambaliza National High School
2010-01-07	9928	Establishing a National High School: Pantaleon Cudiera Memorial National High School
2010-01-07	9929	Establishing a National High School: Kitubo National High School
2010-01-07	9930	Establishing a National High School: Macasandig National High School
2010-01-07	9931	Establishing a National High School: Camanga National High School
2010-01-07	9932	Establishing a National High School: General Emilio Aguinaldo National High School
2010-01-07	9933	Establishing a National High School: Macapari National High School
2010-01-07	9934	Establishing a National High School: Dologon National High School
2010-01-07	9935	Converting a High School Annex into an Independent National High School: Keytodac National High School
2010-01-07	9936	Converting a High School Annex into an Independent National High School: Lupon National Comprehensive High School
2010-01-07	9937	Converting a High School Annex into an Independent National High School: Sangay National High School
2010-01-07	9938	Converting a High School Annex into an Independent National High School: Magnaga National High School
2010-01-07	9939	Converting a High School Annex into an Independent National High School : Ramonito P. Maravilla Sr. National High School
2010-01-07	9940	Converting a High School Annex into an Independent National High School: Adriano Cabardo National High School
2010-01-07	9941	Converting a High School Annex into an Independent National High School: Barangay Estado National High School
2010-01-07	9942	Converting a High School Annex into an Independent National High School: Puerto National High School
2010-01-07	9943	Converting a High School Annex into an Independent National High School: Bugo National High School
2010-01-07	9944	Establishing a National High School: Concepcion National High School
2010-01-07	9945	Establishing a National High School: Calandagan National High School
2010-01-13	9946	Amending RA 910: Granting Additional Benefits to Members of the Judiciary
2010-01-15	9947	Establishing a National High School: Malagandis National High School
2010-01-15	9948	Establishing a National High School: Guintoloan National High School
2010-01-15	9949	Establishing a National High School: Efegenio Lizares National High School
2010-01-15	9950	Establishing a National High School: Tablon National High School
2010-01-15	9951	Establishing a National High School: Ilog National High School
2010-01-15	9952	Establishing a National High School: Vicente L. Pimentel Sr. National High School
2010-01-15	9953	Establishing a National High School: Quezon National High School
2010-01-15	9954	Establishing a National High School: Tario Lim National Memorial High School
2010-01-15	9955	Establishing a National High School: Macasing National High School
2010-01-15	9956	Establishing a National High School: Lintugop National High School
2010-01-15	9957	Establishing a National High School: Matalang National High School
2010-01-15	9958	Converting a High School Annex into an Independent National High School: Panikian National High School
2010-01-15	9959	Converting a High School Annex into an Independent National High School: Sisay National High School
2010-01-15	9960	Converting a High School Annex into an Independent National High School: Tagugpo National High School
2010-01-15	9961	Converting a High School Annex into an Independent National High School: Melale National High School
2010-01-15	9962	Converting a High School Annex into an Independent National High School: Pindasan National High School
2010-01-15	9963	Establishing a National High School: Governor Evelio B. Javier Memorial National High School
2010-01-15	9964	Converting a High School Annex into an Independent National High School: Sibalom National High School
2010-01-15	9965	Renaming a Road: Francisco S. Dizon Road
2010-01-18	9966	Converting a State College into a State University: Sultan Kudarat State University (SKSU)
2010-02-06	9967	Electric Power Distribution Franchise: San Fernando Electric Light and Power Company, Inc
2010-02-06	9968	Electric Power Distribution Franchise: Cabanatuan Electric Corporation (Formerly, Samahang Magsasaka, Incorporada)
2010-02-06	9969	Electric Power Distribution Franchise: Dagupan Electric Corporation
2010-02-08	9970	Appropriations Act of 2010
2010-02-10	9971	Establishing a National High School: Mayo National High School
2010-02-10	9972	Establishing a National High School: Lavigan National High School
2010-02-10	9973	Establishing a National High School: Badas National High School
2010-02-10	9974	Establishing a National High School: Cantilan National High School
2010-02-10	9975	Establishing a National High School: Don Carlos National High School
2010-02-10	9976	Converting a High School Annex into an Independent National High School: Ulip National High School
2010-02-10	9977	Converting a High School Annex into an Independent National High School: Awao National High School
2010-02-10	9978	Converting a High School Annex into an Independent National High School: Don Salvador Lopez National High School
2010-02-10	9979	Converting a High School Annex into an Independent National High School: Bulawan National High School
2010-02-10	9980	Converting a High School Annex into an Independent National High School: Kawayan National High School
2010-02-10	9981	Converting a High School Annex into an Independent National High School: Balubal National High School
2010-02-10	9982	Converting a High School Annex into an Independent National High School: San Isidro National High School
2010-02-10	9983	Converting a High School into a National High School: Buenavista National High School
2010-02-10	9984	Converting a High School Annex into an Independent National High School: San Jose National High School
2010-02-10	9985	Converting a High School Annex into an Independent National High School: Mone National High School
2010-02-10	9986	Converting a High School Annex into an Independent National High School: Fishing Village Comprehensive National High School
2010-02-10	9987	Converting a High School into a National High School: La Fortuna National High School
2010-02-10	9988	Converting a High School Annex into an Independent National High School: Santa Maria National High School
2010-02-10	9989	Separating Secondary Programs of a School into an Independent National High School: Cawayan National High School
2010-02-10	9990	Converting a Barangay High School into a National High School: Naawan National High School
2010-02-10	9991	Converting a High School Annex into an Independent National High School: Baluan National High School
2010-02-10	9992	Converting a Road into National Road: Antequera-San Isidro-Libertad (Tubigon) Road
2010-02-12	9993	Philippine Coast Guard Act of 2009: Repealing RA 5173
2010-02-15	9994	Amending RA 7432: Expanded Senior Citizens Act of 2010
2010-02-15	9995	Anti-Photo and Video Voyeurism Act of 2009
2010-02-17	9996	Mindanao Development Authority (MinDA) Act of 2010
2010-02-18	9997	National Commission on Muslim Filipinos Act of 2009
2010-02-22	9998	Converting a State College into a State University: Surigao del Sur State University
2010-02-23	9999	Free Legal Assistance Act of 2010
2010-02-23	10000	Agri-Agra Reform Credit Act of 2009
2010-02-23	10001	Amending the National Internal Revenue Code of 1997 or RA 8424: Reducing Taxes on Life insurance Policies
2010-02-23	10002	Establishing a National High School: Nasipit National High School
2010-02-23	10003	Establishing a National High School: Cabadbaran City National High School
2010-02-23	10004	Establishing a National High School: Western Biliran High School for the Arts and Culture
2010-02-23	10005	Establishing a National High School: Information and Communications Technology (ICT) High School of Eastern Biliran
2010-02-23	10006	Establishing a National High School: Saluyong National High School
2010-02-23	10007	Converting a High School Annex into an Independent National High School: Bato National High School
2010-02-23	10008	Converting a High School Annex into an Independent National High School: Mangilay National High School
2010-02-23	10009	Converting a High School Annex into an Independent National High School: Nonito Paz Arroyo Memorial National High School
2010-02-23	10010	Converting a High School into a National High School: Bato National High School
2010-02-23	10011	Converting a Road into National Road: Bacon-Sawanga-Prieto Diaz Road
2010-02-23	10012	Converting a Road into National Road: Eastern Bobongan-Sominot-Midsalip-Dumingag National Road
2010-02-23	10013	Converting a Road into National Road: Ubao-Taang National Road
2010-02-23	10014	Converting a Road into National Road: Capas-San Jose-Mayantoc-Malacampa Road
2010-02-23	10015	Converting a Road into National Road: Mabinay-Ayungon National Road
2010-02-23	10016	Converting a Road into National Road: Sindangan-Bayog-Lakewood Road
2010-02-23	10017	Converting a Road into National Road: Bonifacio-Don Victoriano Road
2010-02-23	10018	Converting a Road into National Road: Maripipi Island Circumferential Road
2010-02-23	10019	Converting a Road into National Road
2010-02-23	10020	Establishing a National High School: Maac National High School
2010-03-08	10021	Amending the National Internal Revenue Code of 1997 or RA 8424 – Exchange of Information on Tax Matters Act of 2009
2010-03-08	10022	Amending the Migrant workers and Overseas Filipinos Act of 1995 or RA 8042: Improving Standard of Protection and Welfare to Migrant Workers, Overseas Filipino Workers, and their Families (Read about the International labour law)
2010-03-09	10023	Issuance of Free Patents to Residential Lands
2010-03-09	10024	Philippine Respiratory Therapy Act of 2009
2010-03-11	10025	Converting an Elementary School into an Integrated School: Ilaya Barangka Integrated School
2010-03-11	10026	Amending the National Internal Revenue Code of 1997 or RA 8424: Granting Tax Exemption to Local Water Districts
2010-03-13	10027	Radio, Television, and Satellite Broadcasting Franchise: Aurora Technological Institute, Inc
2010-03-16	10028	Amending the Rooming-in and Breastfeeding Act of 1992 or RA 7600: Expanded Breastfeeding promotion Act of 2009
2010-03-16	10029	Philippine Psychology Act of 2009
2010-03-16	10030	Converting a Road into National Road: Bakong-Tubig Indangan-Tonggusong-Tampakan Road
2010-03-18	10031	Establishing a National High School: Cantubod National High School
2010-03-18	10032	Establishing a National High School: Diwat National High School
2010-03-18	10033	Establishing a National High School: Don Ynocencio A. Del Rosario National High School
2010-03-18	10034	Converting a National High School into a National Science High School: Ubay National Science High School
2010-03-18	10035	Converting a High School into a National High School: Hinawanan National High School
2010-03-18	10036	Converting a High School into a National High School: Bayawahan National High School
2010-03-18	10037	Converting a High School Annex into an Independent National High School: Francisco Dagohoy Memorial High School
2010-03-18	10038	Establishing a National High School: Don Filomeno M. Torres Memorial National High School
2010-03-18	10039	Establishing a National High School: Ubaldo Iway Memorial National High School
2010-03-18	10040	Converting a Road into National Road: Balilihan-Hanopol-Batuan National Road
2010-03-18	10041	Converting a Road into National Road: Leganes-Santa Barbara National Road
2010-03-18	10042	Converting a Road into National Road: Dapa-Union-General Luna Road
2010-03-18	10043	Establishing a Health Institute Integrated with a Hospital
2010-03-19	10044	Establishing a National High School: Kinuman Norte National High School
2010-03-19	10045	Establishing a National High School: Gala National High School
2010-03-19	10046	Establishing a National High School: Taming National High School
2010-03-19	10047	Establishing a National High School: Tabid National High School
2010-03-19	10048	Establishing a National High School: Upper Usugan National Comprehensive High School
2010-03-19	10049	Converting a High School Annex into an Independent National High School: San Miguel National High School
2010-03-19	10050	Renaming a Bridge: President Diosdado P. Macapagal Bridge
2010-03-19	10051	Naming a New Bridge: Pres. Diosdado P. Macapagal Bridge
2010-03-19	10052	Renaming a Road: Mayor Ramon T. Pastor Sr. Street
2010-03-19	10053	Renaming a Road: Labanan sa Binakayan Road
2010-03-23	10054	Motorcycle Helmet Act of 2009
2010-03-23	10055	Philippine Technology Transfer Act of 2009
2010-03-24	10056	Establishing a National High School: Calabayan National High School
2010-03-24	10057	Establishing a National High School: Sikatuna National Agricultural High School
2010-03-24	10058	Establishing a National High School: Lubang National High School
2010-03-24	10059	Establishing a National High School: Tenani Integrated National High School
2010-03-24	10060	Converting a High School into a National High School: Anoling National High School
2010-03-24	10061	Establishing a High School Annex: Hampipila National High School Annex
2010-03-24	10062	Converting a High School into a National High School: Cogtong National High School
2010-03-24	10063	Converting a High School into a National High School: Oy National High School
2010-03-24	10064	Converting a High School Annex into an Independent National High School: Sun Valley National High School
2010-03-24	10065	Converting a High School Annex into an Independent National High School: Moonwalk National High School
2010-03-26	10066	National Cultural Heritage Act of 2009
2010-04-06	10067	Tubbataha Reefs Natural Park Act of 2009
2010-04-06	10068	Organic Agriculture Act of 2010
2010-04-06	10069	Declaring Every May 7 as Health workers' Day
2010-04-06	10070	Amending the Magna Carta For Disabled Persons or RA 7277: Institutionalizing a Mechanism to Implement the Magna Carta Nationwide
2010-04-08	10071	Prosecution Service Act of 2010
2010-04-20	10072	Philippine Red Cross Act of 2009
2010-04-20	10073	Girl Scouts of the Philippines Charter of 2009
2010-04-20	10074	Converting an Extension Office into a Regular Office (LTO)
2010-04-20	10075	Converting a Road into National Road: Asuncion-San Isidro-Laak-Veruela Road
2010-04-20	10076	Converting a Road into National Road: Baloi-Matungao-Linamon Road
2010-04-20	10077	Converting a Road into National Road: Mabinay-Bayawan Road
2010-04-20	10078	Converting a Road into National Road: Bato Bato-Lapid Lapid Road
2010-04-20	10079	Converting a Road into National Road: Gil Fernando Avenue
2010-04-20	10080	Converting a High School Annex into an Independent National High School: Langcataon National High School
2010-04-20	10081	Converting a High School Annex into an Independent National High School: Tikalaan National High School
2010-04-20	10082	Converting a High School Annex into an Independent National High School: Dalirig National High School
2010-04-22	10083	Amending the Aurora Special Economic Zone Act of 2007 or RA 9490
2010-05-05	10084	Granting Survivorship Benefits to Surviving Spouse of a Deceased Retired Member of the COA, CSC, COMELEC, and the Ombudsman
2010-05-05	10085	Converting a State College Campus into a Separate State College: North Luzon Philippines State College
2010-05-12	10086	Strengthening Peoples' Nationalism through Philippine History Act
2010-05-13	10087	Changing the Name of a Bureau: National Library of the Philippines
2010-05-13	10088	Anti-Camcording Act of 2010
2010-05-13	10089	Philippine Rubber Research Institute Act of 2010
2010-05-14	10090	Establishing a Municipal Hospital: Aguinaldo Municipal Hospital
2010-05-14	10091	Converting a Road into National Road: Cumadcad-San Isidro-Poblacion Road
2010-05-14	10092	Converting a Road into National Road: Alfonso Lista-Aurora Road
2010-05-14	10093	Converting a Road into National Road: Paniqui-Ramos Road
2010-05-14	10094	Converting a Road into National Road: Alilem-Sugpon-Sudipen Road
2010-05-14	10095	Converting a Road into National Road: Sanga-Sanga-Patal Road
2010-05-14	10096	Converting a Road into National Road: Socorro-Nueva Estrella-Pamosaingan Road
2010-05-14	10097	Converting a Road into National Road: Kiling, Tanauan-Tabontabon-Julita Road
2010-05-14	10098	Converting a Road into National Road: Imelda-Bayog-Kumalarang-Lapuyan-Margosatubig Road
2010-05-14	10099	Converting a Road into National Road: Santa Barbara-New Lucena Road
2010-05-14	10100	Converting a Road into National Road
2010-05-14	10101	Converting a Road into National Road: Umus Mataha-Tanduan-Boki-Pawan-Lupa Pula Road
2010-05-14	10102	Converting a Road into National Road
2010-05-14	10103	Converting a Road into National Road
2010-05-14	10104	Converting a Road into National Road
2010-05-14	10105	Converting a Road into National Road: Corrales Extension Street
2010-05-14	10106	Converting a High School Annex into an Independent National High School: Santa Lucia National High School
2010-05-14	10107	Establishing a National High School: Agripino Manalo National High School
2010-05-14	10108	Establishing a National High School: Damit National High School
2010-05-14	10109	Establishing a National High School: Baluno National High School
2010-05-14	10110	Establishing a National High School: Lanag Norte National High School
2010-05-14	10111	Converting a High School Annex into an Independent National High School: San Roque National High School
2010-05-14	10112	Converting a High School Annex into an Independent National High School: Maximo L. Gatlabayan Memorial National High School
2010-05-14	10113	Establishing a National High School: Betinan National High School
2010-05-14	10114	Converting a High School Annex into an Independent National High School: Otto Lingue National High School
2010-05-14	10115	Converting a High School Annex into an Independent National High School: Aurora National High School
2010-05-14	10116	Establishing a National High School: Dao-an National High School
2010-05-14	10117	Establishing a National High School: Bulawan National High School
2010-05-14	10118	Establishing a National High School: Laureano Salusod National High School
2010-05-14	10119	Establishing a National High School: Malim National High School
2010-05-14	10120	Converting a High School Annex into an Independent National High School: Lilingayon National High School
2010-05-27	10121	Philippine Disaster Risk Reduction and Management Act of 2010
2010-05-27	10122	Amending RA 7165: Strengthening the Literacy Coordinating Council
2010-06-03	10123	Creating additional Branches of the Regional Trial Court
2010-06-03	10124	Changing the Name of a Library: Sentro ng Karunungan Library
2010-06-03	10125	Converting a High School Annex into an Independent National High School: Lourdes National High School
2010-06-03	10126	Establishing a National High School: Vedasto R. Santiago High School
2010-06-03	10127	Establishing a National High School: Julian B. Sumbillo High School
2010-06-03	10128	Establishing a National High School: Allig National Agricultural and Trade High School
2010-06-03	10129	Establishing a National High School: San Francisco National Agricultural and Trade High School
2010-06-03	10130	Establishing a National High School: Swan National Agricultural and Trade High School
2010-06-03	10131	Converting a High School Annex into an Independent National High School: San Juan National High School
2010-06-03	10132	Establishing a National High School: San Fernando City National Vocational High School
2010-06-03	10133	Establishing a National High School: Luna National Vocational High School
2010-06-03	10134	Establishing a National High School: Locuban National High School
2010-06-03	10135	Establishing a National High School: Tina National High School
2010-06-03	10136	Converting a Road into National Road: Piñan-Mutia Road
2010-06-03	10137	Converting a Road into National Road: Rawis-Talisay Road
2010-06-03	10138	Converting a Road into National Road: Shoe Avenue
2010-06-03	10139	Converting a Road into National Road
2010-06-03	10140	Converting a Road into National Road: Bacolod-Madalum Highway
2010-06-03	10141	Converting a Road into National Road: Tanjay-Pamplona-Santa Catalina Road
2010-08-16	10142	Financial Rehabilitation and Insolvency Act of 2010: Repealing the Insolvency Act or Act 1956
2010-07-31	10143	Philippine Tax Academy Act
2010-05-31	10144	Granting Citizenship to a Person
2010-08-20	10145	Converting a High School Annex into an Independent National High School: Matam National High School
2010-08-20	10146	Converting a High School Annex into an Independent National High School: Diongan National High School

=== 2009 (9519–9999) ===
Date approved	RA number	Title/category
2009-01-07	9519	Converting a State College into a State University: Mindanao University of Science and Technology (MUST)
2009-02-17	9520	Amending the Cooperative Code of the Philippines or RA 6938: the Philippine Cooperative Code of 2008
2009-03-05	9521	National Book Development Trust Fund Act
2009-03-10	9522	Amending the Archipelagic Baselines of the Territorial Sea of the Philippines, or RA 3046 and RA 5446 (Read about the Convention)
2009-03-12	9523	Amending the Domestic Adoption Act of 1998 (RA 8552), the Inter-Country Adoption Act of 1995 (RA 8043) and the Child and Youth Welfare Code (PD 603): Requiring the Certification of the DSWD in a Child's Availability for Adoption
2009-03-12	9524	Appropriations Act of 2009
2009-03-23	9525	Supplemental Appropriations for an Automated Election System
2009-03-24	9526	Converting an Elementary School into an Integrated School: Eulogio Rodriguez Integrated School
2009-03-24	9527	Converting an Elementary School into an Integrated School: Highway Hills Integrated School
2009-03-24	9528	Converting an Elementary School Annex into an Independent Elementary School: Pleasant Hills Elementary School
2009-03-24	9529	Establishing a National High School: Tinagacan National High School
2009-03-24	9530	Establishing a National High School: Magdaup National High School
2009-03-24	9531	Establishing a National High School: Southern Davao National High School
2009-03-24	9532	Establishing a National High School: Camaman-an National High School
2009-03-24	9533	Establishing a National High School: Tuy National High School
2009-03-24	9534	Establishing a National High School: Vega National High School
2009-03-24	9535	Establishing a National High School: Dangay National High School
2009-03-24	9536	Amending RA 8569: Establishing a National High School: Gov. Jacinto C. Borja National High School
2009-03-24	9537	Establishing a National Science High School: Agusan Del Sur National Science High School
2009-03-24	9538	Establishing an Integrated School: Rizal Integrated National School
2009-03-24	9539	Establishing a National High School: Mount Carmel National High School
2009-03-24	9540	Establishing a National High School: Padada National High School
2009-03-24	9541	Establishing a National High School: Del Pilar National High School
2009-03-24	9542	Establishing a National High School: Dinapa National High School
2009-03-24	9543	Establishing a National High School: San Roque National High School
2009-03-24	9544	Establishing a National High School: Ganao National High School
2009-03-24	9545	Establishing a National High School: Tuba Central National High School
2009-03-24	9546	Establishing a National High School: Guinoman National High School
2009-04-01	9547	Amending the Special Program for Employment of Students or RA 7323: Strengthening and Expanding Coverage of the Program [Amended by: RA 10917]
2009-04-17	9548	Establishing an Arts and Culture High School: Bikol High School for the Arts and Culture
2009-04-17	9549	Establishing a National High School: Poblacion Comprehensive National High School
2009-04-17	9550	Establishing a National High School: Minoyan National High School
2009-04-17	9551	Establishing a National High School: Bogayo National High School
2009-04-17	9552	Establishing a National High School: Lagawe National High School
2009-04-17	9553	Establishing an Integrated School: Buhatan Integrated National School
2009-04-17	9554	Establishing an Integrated National High School: Binalian Integrated National High School
2009-04-17	9555	Establishing a National High School: Napo-Tuyak National High School
2009-04-17	9556	Establishing a National High School: Sagucan National High School
2009-04-17	9557	Establishing a National High School: Felimon M. Salcedo Sr. Memorial National High School
2009-04-17	9558	Establishing a National High School: San Antonio National High School
2009-04-17	9559	Establishing a National High School: Bululawan National High School
2009-04-17	9560	Establishing a National High School: Handumon National High School
2009-04-17	9561	Establishing a National High School: Panlayaan National High School
2009-04-17	9562	Establishing a National High School: Bayasong National High School
2009-04-17	9563	Establishing a National High School: Togoron National High School
2009-04-17	9564	Establishing a National High School: Libayoy National High School
2009-04-17	9565	Establishing a National High School: Picanan National High School
2009-04-17	9566	Establishing a National High School: San Jose National High School
2009-04-17	9567	Establishing a National High School: Mabunao National High School
2009-04-17	9568	Establishing a National High School: Katipunan National High School
2009-04-17	9569	Establishing a National High School: Bernardino B. Bosque National High School
2009-04-17	9570	Establishing a National High School: Dimanpudso National High School
2009-04-17	9571	Establishing a National High School: Catmon National High School
2009-04-17	9572	Establishing a National High School: Congressman Hilarion J. Ramiro Jr. Memorial National High School
2009-04-17	9573	Establishing a National High School: Bulihan National High School
2009-04-17	9574	Establishing a National High School: Mabini National High School
2009-04-17	9575	Establishing a National High School: Picong National High School
2009-04-29	9576	Amending the Philippine Deposit Insurance Corporation (PDIC) Charter or RA 3591: Increasing the Maximum Deposit insurance Coverage and Strengthening the Regulatory and Administrative and Financial Capability of PDIC
2009-04-30	9577	Establishing a National High School: Lianga National Comprehensive High School
2009-04-30	9578	Establishing a National High School: Jupi National High School
2009-04-30	9579	Establishing a National High School: Gate National High School
2009-04-30	9580	Establishing a National High School: Naneng National High School
2009-04-30	9581	Establishing a National High School: Recodo National High School
2009-04-30	9582	Establishing a National High School: Datu Jose A. Libayao Memorial National High School
2009-04-30	9583	Establishing a National High School: Mesaoy National High School
2009-04-30	9584	Establishing a National High School: Sagayen National High School
2009-04-30	9585	Establishing a National High School: Semong National High School
2009-04-30	9586	Establishing a National High School: Marayag National High School
2009-04-30	9587	Establishing a National High School: Mailhi National High School
2009-04-30	9588	Establishing a National High School: Sinubong National High School
2009-04-30	9589	Establishing a National High School: Cadandanan National High School
2009-04-30	9590	Establishing a National High School: Lajong National High School
2009-05-01	9591	Amending the Charter of the City of Malolos or RA 8754: Creating a Legislative District: Lone District of the City of Malolos
2009-05-08	9592	Amending the Bureau of Fire Protection and Bureau of Jail Management and Penology Professionalization Act of 2004 or RA 9263: Extending for 5 Years the Reglementary Period for Complying with the Educational Qualification and Eligibility for Appointment
2009-05-12	9593	The Tourism Act of 2009
2009-05-13	9594	Establishing a National High School: Capisan National High School
2009-05-13	9595	Establishing a National High School: Salapungan National High School
2009-05-13	9596	Establishing a National High School: Santo Tomas National High School
2009-05-13	9597	Establishing a National High School: Saravia National High School
2009-05-13	9598	Establishing a National High School: Timalang National High School
2009-05-13	9599	Establishing a National High School: Dacudac National High School
2009-05-13	9600	Establishing a National High School: Buringal National High School
2009-05-13	9601	Establishing a National High School: Data National High School
2009-05-13	9602	Establishing a National High School: Tamboan National High School
2009-05-13	9603	Establishing a National High School: Saclit National High School
2009-05-13	9604	Establishing a National High School: Abatan National High School
2009-05-13	9605	Establishing a National High School: Talon-Talon National High School
2009-05-13	9606	Establishing a National High School: Bunguiao National High School
2009-05-13	9607	Establishing a National High School: FVR National High School
2009-05-13	9608	Establishing a National High School: Don Mariano Marcos National High School
2009-05-13	9609	Establishing a National High School: Paradise Embac National High School
2009-05-13	9610	Establishing a National High School: Eusebia Paz Arroyo Memorial National High School
2009-05-13	9611	Establishing a National High School: Graceville National High School
2009-05-13	9612	Establishing a National High School: Eastern Laua-an National High School
2009-05-13	9613	Establishing a National High School: Calipayan National High School
2009-05-13	9614	Establishing a National High School: Moncada National High School
2009-05-13	9615	Establishing a National High School: Tingco National High School
2009-05-13	9616	Establishing a National High School: Palanas National High School
2009-05-13	9617	Establishing a National High School: San Leonardo National High School
2009-05-13	9618	Establishing a National High School: Southern Tinglayan National High School
2009-05-13	9619	Establishing a National High School: Lilo-an National High School
2009-05-13	9620	Converting a Science High School into a National Science High School: Negros Occidental National Science High School
2009-05-13	9621	Establishing a National Agro-Industrial High School: Camarines Sur National Agro-Industrial High School
2009-05-13	9622	Establishing a National High School: Bangbang National High School
2009-05-13	9623	Establishing a National High School: Agoncillo National High School
2009-05-13	9624	Establishing a National High School: Kauswagan National High School
2009-05-13	9625	Establishing a National High School: Mecolong National High School
2009-05-13	9626	Establishing a National High School: Balintawak National High School
2009-05-13	9627	Establishing a National High School: Malaking Ilog National High School
2009-05-13	9628	Converting a High School into a National High School: Pilar National Comprehensive High School
2009-05-13	9629	Establishing a National High School: Lubuagan National High School
2009-05-13	9630	Establishing a Science High School: Davao Oriental Regional Science High School
2009-05-13	9631	Establishing a National High School: Tandubuay National High School
2009-05-13	9632	Establishing a National High School: Maruing National High School
2009-05-13	9633	Establishing a National High School: Guling National High School
2009-05-13	9634	Establishing a National High School: Teniapan National High School
2009-05-13	9635	Establishing a National High School: Panubigan National High School
2009-05-13	9636	Establishing a National High School: Indahag National High School
2009-05-13	9637	Establishing a National High School: Pagayawan National High School
2009-05-13	9638	Converting a High School Annex into an Independent National High School: Roxas National High School
2009-05-13	9639	Converting a High School Annex into an Independent National High School: Santa Fe National High School
2009-05-21	9640	Amending the Local Government Code of 1991 or RA 7160: On Amusement Tax
2009-05-29	9641	Changing the Name of a National High School: Don Felix T. Lacson Memorial National High School
2009-06-11	9642	Declaring Every March 16 as Special Nonworking Holiday in Romblon Province in Commemoration of its Foundation
2009-06-11	9643	Declaring Every March 21 a Special Nonworking Holiday in Victorias City in Commemoration of its Conversion into a Component City
2009-06-11	9644	Declaring Every August 28 a Special Nonworking Holiday in Cagayan De Oro City for the Feast of St. Augustine
2009-06-12	9645	Amending the Administrative Code of 1987 or EO 292: the Commemoration of the Foundation of Iglesia ni Cristo Every July 27 as a National Holiday
2009-06-29	9646	Real Estate Service Act of the Philippines
2009-06-30	9647	Philippine Normal University Modernization Act of 2009
2009-06-30	9648	Amending the National Internal Revenue Code of 1997 or RA 8424: Exempting from Documentary Stamp Tax any Sale, Barter, or Exchange of Shares of Stock Listed and Traded through the Stock exchange
2009-07-07	9649	Amending the Charter of the City of General Santos or RA 5412
2009-07-07	9650	Establishing a National High School: Bambang National High School
2009-07-07	9651	Establishing a National Science High School: Siargao National Science High School
2009-07-12	9652	Radio and Television Franchise: Information Broadcast Unlimited, Inc.
2009-07-14	9653	Rent Control Act of 2009 (Residential)
2009-07-17	9654	Declaring Every July 18 a Special Nonworking Holiday in the South Cotabato Province in Commemoration of its Foundation and Culmination of the T'nalak Festival
2009-07-17	9655	Changing the Name of a National High School: Malanday National High School
2009-07-17	9656	Establishing a National High School: Angat National High School
2009-07-17	9657	Establishing a National High School: Santo Niño National High School
2009-07-17	9658	Establishing a National High School: Lian National High School
2009-07-17	9659	Converting a High School Annex into an Independent National High School: Vicente P. Trinidad National High School
2009-07-17	9660	Converting a High School Annex into an Independent National High School: Bignay National High School
2009-07-17	9661	Establishing a National High School: Minuyan National High School
2009-07-17	9662	Establishing a National Science High School: City of San Jose Del Monte National Science High School
2009-07-17	9663	Converting a High School Annex into an Independent National High School: Cupang National High School
2009-07-17	9664	Converting a High School Annex into an Independent National High School: Ganduz National High School
2009-07-17	9665	Establishing a National High School: Baesa National High School
2009-07-17	9666	Converting a High School Annex into an Independent National High School: Santo Niño 3rd National High School
2009-07-17	9667	Converting a High School Annex into an Independent National High School: Burgos National High School
2009-07-17	9668	Establishing a National Agro-Industrial High School: Governor Felicisimo T. San Luis National Agro-Industrial High School
2009-07-17	9669	Converting a High School Annex into an Independent National High School: Arkong Bato National High School
2009-07-17	9670	Establishing a National High School: Apolonio Samson National High School
2009-07-17	9671	Converting a High School into a National High School: Botolan National High School
2009-07-17	9672	Establishing a National Science and Technology High School: Caloocan National Science and Technology High School
2009-07-17	9673	Establishing a National High School: San Roque National High School
2009-07-17	9674	Establishing a National High School: Barangka National High School
2009-07-17	9675	Converting a High School into a National High School: Panan National High School
2009-07-17	9676	Converting a Science High School Annex into an Independent Science High School: Caloocan City Science High School
2009-07-17	9677	Converting a High School into a National High School: New Taugtog National High School
2009-07-17	9678	Establishing a National High School: Kalumpang National High School
2009-07-21	9679	Home Development Mutual Fund Act of 2009: Repealing the Housing loan Condonation Act of 1998 or RA 8501
2009-07-29	9680	Creating additional Branches of the Regional Trial Court
2009-07-29	9681	Converting a High School into a National High School: San Ildefonso National High School
2009-08-01	9682	Local Exchange Network Franchise: Panay Telephone Corporation (PANTELCO III)
2009-08-04	9683	Declaring Every September 18 as Special Nonworking Holiday in Bislig City in Commemoration of its Cityhood
2009-08-04	9684	Renaming a Bridge: Gil Fernando Bridge
2009-08-04	9685	Renaming a Road: Jaime Cardinal Sin Avenue
2009-08-04	9686	Renaming a Road: Gov. Felix O. Alfelor Sr. National Highway
2009-08-04	9687	Renaming a Road: Maximino Noble Sr. Highway
2009-08-04	9688	Establishing a District Engineering Office
2009-08-04	9689	Establishing a District Engineering Office
2009-08-04	9690	Establishing a District Engineering Office
2009-08-04	9691	Establishing a District Engineering Office
2009-08-04	9692	Establishing a District Engineering Office
2009-08-04	9693	Reconstituting a District Engineering Office
2009-08-04	9694	Establishing a District Engineering Office
2009-08-04	9695	Establishing a District Engineering Office
2009-08-04	9696	Establishing a District Engineering Office
2009-08-04	9697	Converting a Sub-District Engineering Office into a District Engineering Office
2009-08-04	9698	Converting a Sub-District Engineering Office into a District Engineering Office
2009-08-06	9699	Establishing a District Engineering Office
2009-08-07	9700	Amending the Comprehensive Agrarian Reform Act of 1988 or RA 6657: Strengthening CARP, Extending the Acquisition and Distribution of Agricultural lands, and Instituting Reforms
2009-08-07	9701	Declaring Every October 2 as an Official Nonworking Holiday in the Majayjay Municipality of Laguna in Commemoration of its Foundation
2009-08-07	9702	Renaming a Road: Gov. Juan G. Frivaldo Highway
2009-08-07	9703	Renaming a Road: Pres. Diosdado P. Macapagal National Highway
2009-08-07	9704	Renaming a Road: M.T. Villanueva Avenue
2009-08-07	9705	Renaming a Road: Mayor Manuel T. Sia Diversion Road
2009-08-07	9706	Declaring Every September 29 as a Special Nonworking Holiday in the Balilihan Municipality of Bohol in Commemoration of its Foundation
2009-08-08	9707	Telecommunications Franchise: Converge Information and Communications Technology Solutions, Inc.
2009-08-12	9708	Amending RA 6975 and RA 8551: Extending for 5 Years the Reglementary Period for Complying with the Educational Qualification for Appointment into the PNP and Adjusting its Promotion System
2009-08-12	9709	Universal Newborn Hearing Screening and Intervention Act of 2009
2009-08-14	9710	The Magna Carta of Women
2009-08-18	9711	Amending the Food, Drug, and Cosmetic Act or RA 3720: the Food and Drug Administration (FDA) Act of 2009
2009-08-26	9712	Establishing a National High School: Maronquillo National High School
2009-08-26	9713	Establishing a National High School: Balaong National High School
2009-09-03	9714	Telecommunications Franchise Renewal: Express Telecommunications Co., Inc. (Formerly, Felix Alberto and Company, Incorporated)
2009-10-09	9715	Converting a Road into National Road: Bagac-Mariveles Road
2009-10-12	9716	Reapportioning Legislative Districts of a Province
2009-10-12	9717	Converting a State College into a State University: Central Bicol State University of Agriculture
2009-10-14	9718	Integrating State Colleges into a State University: Naval State University
2009-10-14	9719	Integrating State Colleges into a State University: Northwest Samar State University
2009-10-14	9720	Converting a State College into a State University: Ifugao State University
2009-10-14	9721	Converting a State College into a State University: Romblon State University
2009-10-14	9722	Converting a State College into a State University: Bohol Island State University (BISU)
2009-10-15	9723	Converting a Municipality into a Component City
2009-10-20	9724	Creating a Legislative District: Lone District of the City of Iligan
2009-10-22	9725	Reapportioning Legislative Districts of a Province
2009-10-22	9726	Creating a Legislative District: Lone District of the City of Lapu-Lapu
2009-10-22	9727	Reapportioning Legislative Districts of a Province
2009-10-23	9728	Freeport Area of Bataan (FAB) Act of 2009
2009-10-23	9729	Climate Change Act of 2009 (Read about the Convention)
2009-10-29	9730	Establishing a National High School: Barugo National High School
2009-10-29	9731	Establishing a National High School: Banawel National High School
2009-10-29	9732	Establishing a National High School: Dalican National High School
2009-10-29	9733	Establishing a National High School: Banguitan National High School
2009-10-29	9734	Converting a High School Annex into an Independent National High School: Mariano Matugas Memorial National High School
2009-10-29	9735	Converting a High School Annex into an Independent National High School: Caridad National High School
2009-10-29	9736	Converting a High School Annex into an Independent National High School: Palitod National High School
2009-10-29	9737	Converting a High School Annex into an Independent National High School: Leseb National High School
2009-10-29	9738	Converting a High School Annex into an Independent National High School: Am-Am National High School
2009-10-29	9739	Converting a High School Annex into an Independent National High School: Lias National High School
2009-10-30	9740	Converting a Municipality into a Component City
2009-11-03	9741	Logging Ban Imposition
2009-11-03	9742	Converting a Provincial Road to National Road
2009-11-06	9743	Amending RA 9119 or the Radio and Television Broadcasting Franchise of Benguet Broadcasting Corporation
2009-11-10	9744	Converting a State College into a State University: Cebu Technological University (CTU)
2009-11-10	9745	Anti-Torture Act of 2009 (Read about the Convention)
2009-11-10	9746	Converting a State College into a State University: University of Antique
2009-11-10	9747	Renaming an Educational Institution: Occidental Mindoro State College
2009-11-10	9748	Declaring Every June 23 as a Special Nonworking Holiday in the Palawan Province
2009-11-10	9749	Declaring Every July 31 as a Special Nonworking Holiday in the Marinduque Province in Commemoration of the Battle of Paye
2009-11-10	9750	Declaring Every September 10 as a Special Nonworking Holiday in San Jose Del Monte City in Commemoration of its Foundation
2009-11-10	9751	Converting a Road into National Road: Malinta-Lagta Road
2009-11-10	9752	Converting a Road into National Road: Demoloc-Little Baguio-Alabel Road
2009-11-10	9753	Converting a High School into a National High School: Congressman Pablo Malasarte National High School
2009-11-10	9754	Renaming an Educational Institution: Godofredo M. Tan Memorial School of Arts and Trades
2009-11-10	9755	Establishing a National High School: Fortuna National High School
2009-11-10	9756	Establishing a National High School: San Sebastian National High School
2009-11-10	9757	Establishing a National High School: Teofilo R. Macaso Memorial National High School
2009-11-10	9758	Establishing a National High School: Poctoy National High School
2009-11-10	9759	Converting a High School Annex into an Independent National High School: Del Carmen National High School
2009-11-10	9760	Converting a High School Annex into an Independent National High School: Libertad National High School
2009-11-10	9761	Converting a High School Annex into an Independent National High School: Nueva Estrella National High School
2009-11-10	9762	Converting a High School Annex into an Independent National High School: Consolacion National High School
2009-11-10	9763	Converting a High School Annex into an Independent National High School: Puangi National High School
2009-11-10	9764	Converting a High School into a National High School: Tagkawayan National High School
2009-11-10	9765	Converting a High School Annex into an Independent National High School: Belwang National High School
2009-11-10	9766	Converting a High School Annex into an Independent National High School: Manuel Adriano Memorial National High School
2009-11-10	9767	Converting a High School Annex into an Independent National High School: Cebuano National High School
2009-11-10	9768	Converting a High School Annex into an Independent National High School: Agapito Amado Memorial National High School
2009-11-10	9769	Converting a High School Annex into an Independent National High School: Aloneros National High School
2009-11-10	9770	Converting a High School Annex into an Independent National High School: President Diosdado Macapagal Memorial National High School
2009-11-10	9771	Converting a High School Annex into an Independent National High School: Bantolinao National High School
2009-11-13	9772	Logging Ban Imposition
2009-11-14	9773	Radio and Television Broadcasting Franchise: Philippine Collectivemedia Corporation
2009-11-17	9774	Reapportioning Legislative Districts of a Province
2009-11-17	9775	Anti-Child pornography Act of 2009 (Read about the Convention and its Optional Protocol)
2009-11-17	9776	Declaring Every August 10 as a Special Nonworking Holiday in San Jose City in Commemoration of its Cityhood
2009-11-17	9777	Declaring Every October 12 as a Special Nonworking Holiday in Getafe Municipality to Commemorate its Foundation
2009-11-17	9778	Declaring Every January 12 as a Special Nonworking Holiday in Talisay City in Commemoration of its Foundation
2009-11-18	9779	Changing the Name of a National High School: Dupax Del Norte National High School
2009-11-18	9780	Establishing a National High School: Dibacong National High School
2009-11-18	9781	Establishing a National High School: Gibacungan National High School
2009-11-18	9782	Converting a High School Annex into an Independent National High School: Daniel Z. Romualdez State Comprehensive School of Fisheries
2009-11-18	9783	Converting a High School Annex into an Independent National High School: Runruno National High School
2009-11-18	9784	Establishing a National High School: Sisim National High School
2009-11-18	9785	Converting a High School Annex into an Independent National High School: Anticala National High School
2009-11-18	9786	Converting a High School Annex into an Independent National High School: Florida National High School
2009-11-18	9787	Converting a High School Annex into an Independent National High School: San Rafael National High School
2009-11-18	9788	Converting a High School Annex into an Independent National High School: Bansa National High School
2009-11-18	9789	Converting a High School Annex into an Independent National High School: Saliok National High School
2009-11-18	9790	Culion Sanitarium Conversion and Upgrading Act of 2009
2009-11-19	9791	Converting a Regional hospital into a Medical Center: Batangas Medical Center (Amending RA 7532)
2009-11-19	9792	Changing the Name of a Medical Institution: Southern Philippines Medical Center with Increased Bed Capacity and Medical Personnel, and Upgrade of Services, Facilities and Professional Health Care
2009-11-19	9793	Increasing Bed Capacity of a Hospital: Eastern Visayas Regional Medical Center with an Upgrade of Services, Facilities and Professional Health Care, and Increased Medical Personnel
2009-11-19	9794	Converting a Provincial Road to National Road
2009-11-19	9795	Converting a Road into National Road: Iloilo-Leganes-Dumangas Coastal Road
2009-11-19	9796	Converting a Road into National Road: A Portion of the Kawit-Noveleta Diversion Road
2009-11-19	9797	Converting a Provincial Road to National Road: Rizal-San Jose City Road
2009-11-20	9798	Renaming an Educational Institution: Pangasinan Technological Institute (PTI)
2009-11-20	9799	Converting a Provincial Road to National Road: Tungkong Mangga-Muzon National Road
2009-11-20	9800	Converting a Provincial Road to National Road: Bongabong-Sagana-Roxas-San Aquilino Road
2009-11-20	9801	Converting a Provincial Road to National Road: Mauban-Tignoan Road
2009-11-20	9802	Converting a Road into National Road: Silay-Lantawan Road
2009-11-25	9803	Food donation Act of 2009 (Read about the Convention)
2009-11-26	9804	Converting a High School into a National High School: Fermin Tayabas National High School
2009-11-26	9805	Converting a High School into a National High School: Fatima National High School
2009-11-26	9806	Converting a High School into a National High School: Baclayon National High School
2009-11-26	9807	Converting a High School Annex into an Independent National High School: Ned National High School
2009-11-26	9808	Converting a High School Annex into an Independent National High School: New Dumangas National High School
2009-11-26	9809	Converting a High School Annex into an Independent National High School: Mansasa National High School
2009-11-26	9810	Converting a High School Annex into an Independent National High School: Calape National High School
2009-11-26	9811	Converting a High School Annex into an Independent National High School: Tipunan National High School
2009-11-26	9812	Converting a High School Annex into an Independent National High School: Pamosaingan National High School
2009-11-26	9813	Converting a High School Annex into an Independent National High School: Lambontong National High School
2009-11-26	9814	Converting a High School Annex into an Independent National High School: Bayanihan National High School
2009-11-26	9815	Converting a High School Annex into an Independent National High School: Borlongan National High School
2009-11-26	9816	Converting a High School Annex into an Independent National High School: Tapapan National High School
2009-11-26	9817	Converting a High School Annex into an Independent National High School: Tucucan National High School
2009-11-26	9818	Converting a High School Annex into an Independent National High School: Bucay Pait National High School
2009-11-26	9819	Establishing an Annex to a National High School: Makinhas National High School Annex
2009-11-26	9820	Establishing an Annex to a National High School: San Isidro National High School Annex
2009-11-26	9821	Converting a High School Annex into an Independent National High School: Bonfal National High School
2009-11-26	9822	Converting a High School Annex into an Independent National High School: Paima National High School
2009-11-26	9823	Converting a High School Annex into an Independent National High School: Casecnan National High School
2009-11-26	9824	Converting an Integrated School into a National High School: Makiwalo National High School
2009-11-26	9825	Converting a High School Annex into an Independent National High School: Veriato National High School
2009-11-26	9826	Establishing a National High School: Bacongco National High School
2009-11-26	9827	Converting a High School Annex into an Independent National High School: Martinez Cuyangan National High School
2009-12-03	9828	Creating the Military service Board
2009-12-03	9829	Pre-Need Code of the Philippines
2009-12-03	9830	Converting a High School Annex into an Independent National High School: Jesus J. Soriano National High School
2009-12-03	9831	Converting a High School Annex into an Independent National High School: Governor Vicente Duterte National High School
2009-12-09	9832	Converting a State College into a State University: Don Honorio Ventura Technological State University (DHVTSU)
2009-12-10	9833	Converting a High School into a National High School: Sandingan National High School
2009-12-10	9834	Converting a High School into a National High School: Cawayanan National High School
2009-12-10	9835	Establishing a National High School: Malacampa National High School
2009-12-10	9836	Converting a High School into a National High School: Bantugan National High School
2009-12-10	9837	Converting a High School into a National High School: Panagan National High School
2009-12-10	9838	Converting a High School into a National High School: Tinawagan National High School
2009-12-10	9839	Converting a High School into a National High School: Mantacida National High School
2009-12-10	9840	Converting a High School into a National High School: Loon South National High School
2009-12-10	9841	Converting a High School Annex into an Independent National High School: Ampucao National High School
2009-12-10	9842	Converting a High School Annex into an Independent National High School: Loo National High School
2009-12-10	9843	Converting a High School Annex into an Independent National High School: Pinsao National High School
2009-12-10	9844	Converting a High School Annex into an Independent National High School: Caba National High School
2009-12-10	9845	Converting a High School Annex into an Independent National High School: Tulaed National High School
2009-12-10	9846	Converting a High School into a National High School: San Isidro National High School
2009-12-11	9847	Establishing a Protected area: Mountains Banahaw and San Cristobal Protected Landscape (MBSCPL) Act of 2009
2009-12-11	9848	Creating additional Branches of the Regional Trial Court and the Metropolitan Trial Court
2009-12-11	9849	Amending the Administrative Code of 1987 or EO 292: the Observation of Eidul Adha on Every 10th Day of Zhul Hijja as a National Holiday
2009-12-11	9850	Declaring Arnis as the National Martial Art and Sport
2009-12-11	9851	Philippine Act on Crimes Against International humanitarian law, Genocide, and Other Crimes against humanity (Read about the Geneva Conventions, the Hague Convention, the Genocide Convention, and the Convention against Torture)
2009-12-15	9852	Integrating State Colleges into a State University: Jose Rizal Memorial State University (JRMSU)
2009-12-15	9853	Amending the Customs Brokers Act of 2004 or RA 9280: Inclusion of Primary Parties in Customs declaration
2009-12-16	9854	Integrating State Colleges into a State University: Caraga State University
2009-12-16	9855	Converting a High School into a National High School: Magsaysay National High School
2009-12-17	9856	The Real estate investment trust (REIT) Act of 2009
2009-12-20	9857	Telecommunications Franchise: Schutzengel Telecom, Inc.
2009-12-20	9858	Amending the Family Code of the Philippines or EO 209: Legitimation of Children Born to Parents Below Marrying age
2009-12-20	9859	Amending RA 6769: Adjusting/Correcting Territorial Boundaries of the San Jose Municipality
2009-12-20	9860	Integrating an Extension Campus as a Regular Branch of Bicol University
2009-12-20	9861	Establishing a National High School: Agay-Ayan National High School
2009-12-20	9862	Establishing a National High School: Pasian National High School
2009-12-20	9863	Establishing a National High School: Danggo National High School
2009-12-20	9864	Establishing a National High School: La Trinidad National High School
2009-12-20	9865	Converting a High School Annex into an Independent National High School: Magsaysay National High School
2009-12-20	9866	Converting a National High School into a National Vocational High School: Ayangan National Agricultural and Vocational High School
2009-12-20	9867	Converting a High School Annex into an Independent National High School: Southern Hingyon National High School
2009-12-20	9868	Converting a High School into a National High School: Datu Lipus Makapandong National High School
2009-12-20	9869	Converting a High School Annex into an Independent National High School: Roxas National High School
2009-12-20	9870	Converting a High School Annex into an Independent National High School: Taloy Sur National High School
2009-12-31	9871	Converting a High School Annex into an Independent National High School: Adaoay National High School
2009-12-31	9872	Establishing a Science High School: Biliran Science High School
2009-12-31	9873	Converting a High School Annex into an Independent National High School: Camandag National High School
2009-12-31	9874	Converting a High School into a National High School: Nato National High School
2009-12-31	9875	Converting a High School into a National High School: Bitaogan National High School
2009-12-31	9876	Converting a High School Annex into an Independent National High School: Catlubong National High School
2009-12-31	9877	Converting a High School Annex into an Independent National High School: Laureta National High School
2009-12-31	9878	Converting a High School Annex into an Independent National High School: Kidawa National High School
2009-12-31	9879	Converting a High School Annex into an Independent National High School: Tuboran National High School
2009-12-31	9880	Converting a High School Annex into an Independent National High School: Kao National High School
2009-12-31	9881	Converting a High School Annex into an Independent National High School: Mil-an National High School
2009-12-31	9882	Converting a High School Annex into an Independent National High School: Balungisan National High School
2009-12-31	9883	Converting a High School Annex into an Independent National High School: Kalanguya National High School
2009-12-31	9884	Converting a High School Annex into an Independent National High School: Caragasan National High School
2009-12-31	9885	Converting a High School Annex into an Independent National High School: New Albay National High School
2009-12-31	9886	Converting a High School Annex into an Independent National High School: Nuevo Iloco National High School
2009-12-31	9887	Converting a High School Annex into an Independent National High School: Bolhoon National High School
2009-12-31	9888	Converting a High School Annex into an Independent National High School: Mainit National High School
2009-12-31	9889	Converting a High School Annex into an Independent National High School: Mayaon National High School
2009-12-31	9890	Establishing a National High School: Canayonan National High School
2009-12-31	9891	Converting a High School Annex into an Independent National High School: New Leyte National High School
2009-12-31	9892	Converting a High School Annex into an Independent National High School: Tigao National High School
2009-12-31	9893	Converting a High School Annex into an Independent National High School: Joaquin Smith National High School
2009-12-31	9894	Establishing a National High School: Catalotoan National High School
2009-12-31	9895	Converting a High School Annex into an Independent National High School: Sibulan National High School
2009-12-31	9896	Converting a High School Annex into an Independent National High School: Mangayon National High School
2009-12-31	9897	Converting a High School into a National High School: Aguinaldo National High School
2009-12-31	9898	Converting a High School into a National High School: San Vicente National High School
2009-12-31	9899	Converting a High School Annex into an Independent National High School: Tubalan Comprehensive National High School
2009-12-31	9900	Converting a High School Annex into an Independent National High School: Bangao National High School
2009-12-31	9901	Converting a High School Annex into an Independent National High School: Tawangan-Lusod National High School
2009-12-31	9902	Converting a High School Annex into an Independent National High School: Bulalacao National High School

=== 2008 (9496–9518) ===
Date approved	RA number	Title/category
2008-02-28	9496	Amending the Agricultural Tariffication Act or RA 8178: Extending the Use Period of the Agricultural Competitiveness Enhancement Fund
2008-03-04	9497	Civil Aviation Authority Act of 2008
2008-03-11	9498	Appropriations Act of 2008
2008-04-09	9499	Filipino World War II Veterans Pensions and Benefits Act of 2008
2008-04-29	9500	The University of the Philippines Charter of 2008
2008-05-23	9501	Amending the Magna Carta for Small Enterprises or RA 6977: Magna Carta for Micro, Small, and Medium Enterprises (MSMEs)
2008-06-06	9502	Amending RA 8293, RA 6675, and RA 5921: Universally Accessible Cheaper and Quality Medicines Act of 2008
2008-06-12	9503	Amending RA 1125: Enlarging the Organizational Structure of the Court of Tax Appeals
2008-06-17	9504	Amending the National Internal Revenue Code of 1997 or RA 8424
2008-08-22	9505	Personal Equity and Retirement Account (PERA) Act of 2008
2008-09-28	9506	Bacolor Rehabilitation Council Act
2008-10-13	9507	Socialized and Low-Cost Housing loan Restructuring and Condonation Act of 2008
2008-10-20	9508	Reapportioning Legislative Districts of a Province
2008-10-21	9509	Barangay Livelihood and Skills Training Act of 2008
2008-10-31	9510	Credit Information System Act
2008-12-01	9511	Electricity Transmission Franchise: National Grid Corporation
2008-12-12	9512	Environmental awareness and Education Act of 2008
2008-12-16	9513	Renewable Energy Act of 2008
2008-12-19	9514	Fire code of the Philippines of 2008: Repealing PD 1185
2008-12-19	9515	Defining the Liability of Ship Agents in the Tramp Service
2008-12-22	9516	Amending PD 1866: On Unlawful Manufacture, Sales, Acquisition, Disposition, Importation, or Possession of Explosives or Incendiary devices and of Parts, Ingredients, Machinery, Tool, or Instrument Used or Intended for these Unlawful Activities
2008-12-27	9517	Air Transport Franchise for Domestic and International Service: Southeast Asian Airlines (SEAir), Inc.
2008-12-27	9518	Local Exchange Network Franchise: Metro Kidapawan Telephone Corporation (MKTC)

=== 2007 (9366–9495) ===
Date approved	RA number	Title/category
2007-01-09	9366	Granting Citizenship to a Person
2007-01-12	9367	Biofuels Act of 2006
2007-01-14	9368	Horse Racing Franchise: Mindanao Jockey and Country Club, Inc.
2007-01-23	9369	Amending RA 8436, RA 7166, RA 6646, and BP 881: On the Use of Automated Election System in National and Local Electoral Exercises
2007-02-03	9370	Radio and Television Broadcasting Franchise: Muslim Mindanao Radio and Television Network Corporation
2007-02-22	9371	Reapportioning Legislative districts of Cagayan de Oro City
2007-03-06	9372	Human Security Act of 2007
2007-03-06	9373	Creating additional Branches of the Regional Trial Court
2007-03-06	9374	Creating additional Branches of the Metropolitan Trial Court
2007-03-06	9375	Creating additional Branches of the Regional Trial Court and the Municipal Trial Court
2007-03-06	9376	Creating additional Branches of the Metropolitan Trial Court
2007-03-06	9377	Creating additional Branches of the Regional Trial Court and the Municipal Trial Court
2007-03-07	9378	Declaring Every February 4 a Special Working Holiday in Muntinlupa City in Commemoration of the "Araw ng Kalayaan ng Muntinlupa"
2007-03-08	9379	The Handline fishing Act
2007-03-06	9380	Declaring Every May 6 a Special Working Holiday in Pilar Municipality to Commemorate the Death of its Former Mayor, Manuel Sia
2007-03-09	9381	Electric Power Distribution Franchise Renewal: Angeles Electric Corporation
2007-03-10	9382	Cable/Community Antenna Television Franchise: Cable Link Holdings Corp.
2007-03-10	9383	Radio Broadcasting Franchise: Universidad de Zamboanga
2007-03-10	9384	Radio and Television Broadcasting Franchise: Puerto Princesa Broadcasting Corporation
2007-03-10	9385	Electric Power Distribution Franchise Renewal: La Union Electric Company, Inc
2007-03-10	9386	Radio and Television Broadcasting Franchise: iTransmission, Inc
2007-03-10	9387	Converting a Municipality into a Highly Urbanized City
2007-03-11	9388	Converting a Municipality into a Highly Urbanized City
2007-03-15	9389	Converting a Municipality into a Component City
2007-03-15	9390	Converting a Municipality into a Component City
2007-03-15	9391	Converting a Municipality into a Component City
2007-03-15	9392	Converting a Municipality into a Component City
2007-03-15	9393	Converting a Municipality into a Component City
2007-03-16	9394	Converting a Municipality into a Component City
2007-03-17	9395	Converting a State College into a State University: Southern Luzon State University (SLSU)
2007-03-18	9396	Amending RA 6948: Redefining the Term "Veteran"
2007-03-18	9397	Amending the Urban Development and Housing Act of 1992 or RA 7279: On Disposition of Lands for Socialized Housing
2007-03-18	9398	Converting a Municipality into a Component City
2007-03-20	9399	Declaring a One-Time Amnesty on Certain Tax and Duty Liabilities incurred by Certain Business Enterprises operating within Special Economic Zones and Freeport
2007-03-20	9400	Amending the Bases Conversion and Development Act of 1992 or RA 7227
2007-03-22	9401	Appropriations Act of 2007
2007-03-22	9402	Converting a State College into a State University: Laguna State Polytechnic University
2007-03-22	9403	Integrating State Colleges into a State University: Bataan Peninsula State University (BPSU)
2007-03-23	9404	Converting a Municipality into a Component City
2007-03-23	9405	Converting a Municipality into a Component City
2007-03-23	9406	Amending the Administrative Code of 1987 or EO 292: Reorganizing and Strengthening the Public Attorney's Office (PAO)
2007-03-24	9407	Converting a Municipality into a Component City
2007-03-24	9408	Converting a Municipality into a Component City
2007-03-24	9409	Converting a Municipality into a Component City
2007-03-24	9410	Amending RA 9031: Changing a Special Working Holiday into a Special Nonworking Holiday in Camarines Sur
2007-03-24	9411	Declaring Every January 22 a Special Nonworking Holiday in Vigan City in Commemoration of its Cityhood
2007-03-24	9412	Declaring Every August 20 a Special Nonworking Holiday in Dulag Municipality in Commemoration of its Foundation
2007-03-24	9413	Declaring Every April 3 a Special Nonworking Holiday in Luisiana Municipality in Celebration of the "Araw ng Lubusang Kalayaan Bilang Bayan ng Luisiana" and the Pandan Festival
2007-03-24	9414	Declaring Every June 19 a Special Nonworking Holiday in the Northern Samar Province in Commemoration of its Foundation
2007-03-25	9415	Amending RA 2239: Allowing the Ramon Magsaysay Foundation to Sell or Lease its Land or Space within Their Building
2007-03-25	9416	Declaring Unlawful Any Form of Cheating in the Civil Service Commission Examinations, and the Use and Possession of CSC Examination-Related Materials
2007-03-30	9417	Expanding and Streamlining the Office of the Solicitor General's Bureaucracy, Upgrading Employee Skills, and Augmenting Benefits
2007-04-10	9418	Volunteer Act of 2007
2007-04-10	9419	Increasing Bed Capacity of a Hospital: Amang Rodriguez Memorial Medical Center
2007-04-10	9420	Conversion of a Portion of Bed Capacity For Tertiary General Hospital Use: Dr. Jose N. Rodriguez Memorial Hospital and Sanitarium
2007-04-10	9421	Changing the name of a Medical Institution: Valenzuela Medical Center with Increased Bed Capacity into a Tertiary Level Hospital
2007-04-10	9422	Amending the Migrant Workers and Overseas Filipinos Act of 1995 or RA 8042: Strengthening the Regulatory Functions of the Philippine Overseas Employment Administration (POEA)
2007-04-10	9423	Creating an additional Branch of the Regional Trial Court
2007-04-10	9424	Creating additional Branches of the Metropolitan Trial Court
2007-04-10	9425	Declaring Every December 13 a Special Working Holiday in General Trias Municipality in Commemoration of its Foundation
2007-04-10	9426	Declaring Every March 8 a Special Working Holiday in the Compostela Valley Province in Commemoration of its Foundation
2007-04-10	9427	Declaring Every February 5 a Special Working Holiday in Biñan Municipality to Commemorate its Liberation from Japanese Occupation
2007-04-10	9428	Declaring Every February 14 a Special Working Holiday in Valenzuela City to Commemorate its Conversion into a Highly Urbanized City
2007-04-10	9429	Declaring Every September 18 a Special Working Holiday in Tacurong City in Commemoration of its Cityhood
2007-04-10	9430	Declaring Every July 23 a Special Working Holiday in Tanauan City in Commemoration of the Birth of Apolinario Mabini
2007-04-10	9431	Creating a Barangay: Barangay Fortune
2007-04-10	9432	Creating a Barangay: Barangay Tumana
2007-04-11	9433	Magna Carta for Public Social Workers
2007-04-12	9434	Converting a Municipality into a Component City
2007-04-12	9435	Converting a Municipality into a Component City
2007-04-15	9436	Converting a Municipality into a Component City
2007-04-27	9437	Amending RA 9158: Renaming the Leyte State University as the Visayas State University
2007-04-27	9438	Changing the Name of a National High School: Juan S. Tismo National High School
2007-04-27	9439	Prohibition of the Detention of Patients in Hospitals and Medical Clinics Due to Nonpayment of Hospital Bills or Medical Expenses
2007-04-28	9440	Establishing a Marine Fisheries Laboratory
2007-04-28	9441	Establishing a Marine Research and Breeding Center
2007-04-30	9442	Amending the Magna Carta for Disabled Persons or RA 7277: Provision for other Privileges and Incentives, Prohibitions on Ridicule and Vilification, and Change of the Act's Title to "Magna Carta for Persons with Disability"
2007-05-09	9443	Confirming and Declaring the Validity of Existing Transfer Certificates of Title and Reconstituted Certificates of Title Covering the Banilad Friar Lands Estate
2007-05-09	9444	Declaring a Tourism Zone: Atulayan Island
2007-05-09	9445	Declaring a Tourism Zone: Islands of Lahuy, Cotivas, Guinahuan, Luksuhin, Malibagan, and Masag
2007-05-09	9446	Declaring a Tourism Zone: Bohol
2007-05-15	9447	Changing the name of an Elementary School: Mariana L. Pineda Memorial Elementary School
2007-05-15	9448	Creating an additional Branch of the Regional Trial Court
2007-05-15	9449	Creating an additional Branch of the Municipal Trial Court
2007-05-15	9450	Creating additional Branches of the Municipal Trial Court
2007-05-15	9451	Establishing a National Science High School: Las Piñas City National Science High School
2007-05-15	9452	Converting a High School Annex into an Independent National High School: Caa National High School
2007-05-15	9453	Changing the name of a National High School: Pinto National High School
2007-05-15	9454	Changing the name of a National High School: Dr. Rodolfo V. Pamor Jr. Memorial National High School
2007-05-15	9455	Changing the name of an Elementary School: Egmidio V. Manzo Memorial Elementary Elementary School
2007-05-15	9456	Converting a State College into a State University: Bukidnon State University
2007-05-15	9457	Creating a Barangay: Barangay San Carlos
2007-05-15	9458	Declaring a Tourism Zone(s)
2007-05-15	9459	Establishing a Marine Farm for Oysters, Mussels, Crabs, Prawns, and Shrimps
2007-05-15	9460	Establishing a Marine Research and Breeding Center
2007-05-15	9461	Naming a Road: Marcelino R. Veloso National Highway
2007-05-15	9462	Naming a Road: Apolinario Mabini Superhighway (AMS)
2007-05-15	9463	Naming a Road: Josefa Llanes Escoda National Highway
2007-05-15	9464	Renaming a Road: Romeo G. Guanzon Avenue
2007-05-15	9465	Renaming a Road: Governor Joaquin L. Ortega Avenue
2007-05-15	9466	Renaming a Road: Mayor Lorenzo L. Dacanay Avenue
2007-05-15	9467	Renaming a Road: Congressman Hilarion J. Ramiro By-Pass Road
2007-05-15	9468	Renaming a Road: Jose W. Diokno Boulevard
2007-05-21	9469	Changing the name of a Fisheries School: Bangui Institute of Technology
2007-05-21	9470	National Archives of the Philippines Act of 2007
2007-05-21	9471	Establishing an Aquatic Research and Technology Center
2007-05-22	9472	Amending RA 9045: Excluding the Polytechnic University of the Philippines Campus in Santo Tomas from Batangas State University
2007-05-22	9473	Converting a High School Annex into an Independent National High School: Golden Acres National High School
2007-05-22	9474	Lending Company Regulation Act of 2007
2007-05-22	9475	Changing the name of an Agricultural School: Lasam Institute of Technology
2007-05-22	9476	Renaming a Road: Crisanto M. De Los Reyes Avenue
2007-05-22	9477	Renaming a Road: Jose Abad Santos Avenue (JASA)
2007-05-24	9478	Radio and Television Broadcasting Franchise: Free Air Broadcasting Network Corp.
2007-05-24	9479	Local Exchange Network Franchise Renewal: Ormoc City Telephone Company, Inc. (with Amendments)
2007-05-24	9480	Granting Amnesty on All Unpaid National Internal Revenue Taxes for 2005 and Prior Years
2007-05-25	9481	Amending the Labor Code of the Philippines or PD 442: Strengthening the Workers' Constitutional Right to Self-Organization
2007-05-25	9482	Anti-Rabies Act of 2007
2007-06-02	9483	Oil Pollution Compensation Act of 2007 (Read about the liability and the Fund)
2007-06-02	9484	The Philippine Dental Act of 2007: Repealing the Philippine Dental Act of 1965 or RA 4419, and the Philippine Dental hygienist Act or RA 768 (Read about the history of the practice in the Philippines)
2007-06-02	9485	Anti-Red tape Act of 2007
2007-06-07	9486	Establishing a Protected area: Central Cebu Protected Landscape (CCPL) Act of 2007
2007-06-20	9487	Amending the Charter of the Philippine Amusement and Gaming Corporation or PD 1869
2007-06-24	9488	Renaming a Road: Diosdado Macapagal Highway
2007-06-29	9489	Granting Citizenship to a Person
2007-06-29	9490	Establishing a Special Economic Zone
2007-07-15	9491	Converting a Municipality into a Component City
2007-07-24	9492	Amending EO 292: On the Observance of Regular and Nationwide Special Days
2007-07-25	9493	Recognizing the International Character of the Southville International School
2007-08-22	9494	Establishing a Protected Area: The Mimbilisan Protected Landscape Act
2007-09-07	9495	Creating a Province: Quezon Del Sur (Read on the plebiscite)

=== 2006 (9342–9365) ===
Date approved	RA number	Title/category
2006-01-19	9342	Amending RA 8996 or the Radio and Television Broadcasting Franchise of End Time Mission Broadcasting Service, Inc
2006-04-24	9343	Amending the Special Purpose Vehicle Act of 2002 or RA 9182: On the Period of Application for Establishment and Registration, and on Tax Exemptions and Fee Privileges
2006-04-28	9344	Juvenile Justice and Welfare Act of 2006 (Read about the Convention on the Rights of the Child)
2006-06-05	9345	Converting a Road and a Bridge into National Road: Panglao Island Circumferential Road
2006-06-24	9346	Prohibition of the Imposition of Death Penalty: Repealing RA 8177, and Amending RA 7659 and the Revised Penal Code or Act 3815
2006-07-27	9347	Amending the Labor Code of the Philippines or PD 442: Rationalizing the Composition and Functions of the National Labor Relations Commission
2006-08-04	9348	Converting a Road into National Road
2006-08-04	9349	Converting a Road into National Road: Concepcion-Capas Road
2006-08-04	9350	Converting a Road into National Road: Ramos-Pura Road
2006-08-04	9351	Converting a Road into National Road: Victoria-La Paz Road
2006-08-04	9352	Converting a Road into National Road: Anao-Ramos Road
2006-09-26	9353	Amending RA 9027: Inclusion of Accreted Land into the Territory of Sipalay City
2006-09-28	9354	Radio Broadcasting Franchise: Radio Maria Foundation, Inc.
2006-10-02	9355	Creating a Province: Dinagat Islands
2006-10-02	9356	Converting a Municipality into a Component City
2006-10-10	9357	Reapportioning Legislative districts of Sultan Kudarat
2006-10-17	9358	Supplemental Appropriations Act for 2006
2006-10-17	9359	Establishing a Standby Fund for the Guimaras Oil Spill Clean Up, the Relief for Mayon Volcano#2006 eruptions Eruption Victims, and the Emergency OFW Repatriation Fund
2006-10-26	9360	Reapportioning Legislative districts of Zamboanga Sibugay
2006-11-21	9361	Amending the National Internal Revenue Code of 1997 or RA 8424: On Excess Output or Input Tax
2006-11-30	9362	Granting Citizenship to a Person
2006-11-30	9363	Granting Citizenship to a Person
2006-12-15	9364	Amending the Charter of the City of Marikina or RA 8223: Subdividing its Lone Legislative District into Two Districts
2006-12-21	9365	Creating New Enlisted Ranks in the Armed Forces of the Philippines (AFP): First Chief Master Sergeant and First Master Chief Petty Officer

=== 2005 (9335–9341) ===
Date approved	RA number	Title/category
2005-01-25	9335	Attrition Act of 2005: On the Bureau of Internal Revenue and Bureau of Customs
2005-03-15	9336	Appropriations Act of 2005
2005-05-24	9337	Amending the National Internal Revenue Code of 1997 or RA 8424
2005-07-28	9338	Granting Citizenship to a Person
2005-09-01	9339	Electric Power Distribution Franchise Renewal: Visayan Electric Company, Inc. (VECO)
2005-09-22	9340	Amending the Synchronized Barangay and Sangguniang Kabataan Elections Act or RA 9164: Moving the October 2005 Elections to October 2007
2005-12-21	9341	Rent Control Act of 2005 (Residential)

=== 2004 (9233–9334) ===
Date approved	RA number	Title/category
2004-01-16	9233	Radio and Television Broadcasting Franchise: Asian Multimedia & Production Company, Inc.
2004-01-16	9234	Renaming a Road: Rolando R. Andaya Highway
2004-01-18	9235	Telecommunications Franchise: Digitel Crossing, Inc.
2004-02-03	9236	National Metrology Act of 2003
2004-02-03	9237	Establishing a Protected Area: Mount Apo Protected Area Act of 2003
2004-02-05	9238	Amending the National Internal Revenue Code of 1997 or RA 8424: Excluding Certain Services from VAT Coverage, and Reimposing the GRT on Banks and Non-bank Financial Intermediaries
2004-02-10	9239	Optical Media Act of 2003
2004-02-10	9240	Converting a Hospital into a Medical Center: Las Piñas General Hospital and Satellite Trauma Center
2004-02-10	9241	Amending the National Health Insurance Act of 1995 or RA 7875
2004-02-10	9242	Prescribing the Use of Philippine Tropical Fabrics for Uniforms of Public Officials and Employees
2004-02-17	9243	Amending the National Internal Revenue Code of 1997 or RA 8424: On Documentary Stamp Taxes
2004-02-19	9244	Amending the Local Government Code of 1991 or RA 7160: On the Electoral Recall Process
2004-02-19	9245	Philippine Ear Research Institute Act of 2003
2004-02-19	9246	The Philippine Librarianship Act of 2003: Repealing the Philippine Librarianship Act or RA 6966
2004-02-19	9247	Creating an additional Branch of the Regional Trial Court
2004-02-19	9248	Amending the Charter of the City of Cadiz or RA 4894: On the city's Territorial Boundaries
2004-02-19	9249	Renaming an Educational Institution: Bulacan Agricultural State College (BASC)
2004-02-19	9250	Radio and Television Broadcasting Franchise: Radio Philippines Network, Inc.
2004-02-19	9251	Renaming a Road: Miguel Suarez Highway
2004-02-24	9252	Creating additional Branches of the Municipal Trial Court
2004-02-24	9253	Establishing a National Science High School: Jose Monfort National Science High School
2004-02-24	9254	Establishing a National Science High School: Purificacion Dolor Monfort National Science High School
2004-02-24	9255	Amending the Family Code of the Philippines or EO 209: Allowing Illegitimate Children the Use of the Surname of their Father
2004-02-25	9256	Declaring Every August 21 a Special Nonworking Holiday in Commemoration of the Death of Benigno "Ninoy" Aquino Jr.
2004-02-26	9257	Amending RA 7432: Expanded Senior Citizens Act of 2003
2004-03-02	9258	Guidance and Counseling Act of 2004
2004-03-02	9259	Creating an Incorporated Medical Center: La Union Medical Center
2004-03-05	9260	Converting a State College into a State University: Western Philippines University
2004-03-07	9261	Integrating State Colleges into a State University: Southern Leyte State University
2004-03-08	9262	Anti-Violence Against Women and Their Children Act of 2004
2004-03-10	9263	Bureau of Fire Protection and Bureau of Jail Management and Penology Professionalization Act of 2004
2004-03-10	9264	Converting a Municipality into a Component City
2004-03-15	9265	Creating a Municipality: San Isidro
2004-03-17	9266	The Architecture Act of 2004: Repealing RA 545
2004-03-19	9267	The Securitization Act of 2004
2004-03-19	9268	The Philippine Veterinary Medicine Act of 2004: Repealing RA 382
2004-03-19	9269	Reapportioning Legislative Districts of Zamboanga City
2004-03-19	9270	Naming a Road: Maria Clara L. Lobregat Highway
2004-03-19	9271	Quarantine Act of 2004: Repealing RA 123
2004-03-20	9272	Integrating State Colleges into a State University: Nueva Vizcaya State University
2004-03-21	9273	Converting a State College into a State University: Capiz State University (CAPSU)
2004-03-21	9274	Creating additional Branches of the Municipal Trial Court
2004-03-22	9275	Philippine Clean Water Act of 2004
2004-03-26	9276	Creating additional Branches of the Municipal Trial Court
2004-03-28	9277	Radio and Television Broadcasting Franchise: Leyte State University
2004-03-28	9278	Radio Broadcasting Franchise: Ivatan Foundation for Development Communications Incorporated
2004-03-30	9279	Grant of Special Allowances as Additional Compensation to the National Prosecution Service and the State Counsels in the Department of Justice
2004-03-30	9280	Customs Brokers Act of 2004
2004-03-30	9281	Amending the Agriculture and Fisheries Modernization Act of 1997 or RA 8435: Strengthening the Modernization by Extending the Effectivity of Tax Incentives and the Mandated Funding Support
2004-03-30	9282	Amending RA 1125: Expanding the Jurisdiction of the Court of Tax Appeals, Elevating its Rank to Collegiate Court Level, and Enlarging its Membership
2004-04-01	9283	Amending RA 8101: Expanding the Area of Operation of the Radiotelephone Franchise
2004-03-31	9284	Electric Power Distribution Franchise Renewal: Cagayan Electric Power and Light Co., Inc.
2004-04-02	9285	Alternative Dispute Resolution Act of 2004
2004-04-02	9286	Amending the Provincial Water Utilities Act of 1973 or PD 198: On the Directors's Compensation, and the General Managers of the Utilities
2004-04-02	9287	Amending PD 1602: Increasing the Penalties on Illegal Numbers Games
2004-04-07	9288	Newborn Screening Act of 2004
2004-04-14	9289	Converting a college into a Polytechnic College: Marikina Polytechnic College (MPC)
2004-04-15	9290	Footwear, Leather Goods, and Tannery Industries Development Act
2004-04-16	9291	Converting a Sub-District Engineering Office into a District Engineering Office
2004-04-17	9292	Electronics Engineering Act of 2004: Repealing the Electronics and Communications Engineering Act of the Philippines or RA 5734
2004-04-21	9293	Amending the Philippine Teachers Professionalization Act of 1994 or RA 7836: On the Requirements on the Examination Applicants, and Registration and Exceptions in the Practice of Profession
2004-04-28	9294	Amending the National Internal Revenue Code of 1997 or RA 8424: Restoring Tax Exemptions of Offshore Banking Units and Foreign Currency Deposit Units
2004-05-03	9295	Domestic Shipping Development Act of 2004
2004-05-12	9296	The Meat Inspection Code of the Philippines
2004-05-13	9297	Chemical Engineering Act of 2004: Repealing the Chemical Engineering Act or RA 318
2004-05-13	9298	Philippine Accountancy Act of 2004: Repealing the Revised Accountancy Act or PD 692
2004-06-25	9299	Integrating Colleges into a State University: Negros Oriental State University (NORSU)
2004-06-29	9300	Converting an Elementary School into an Integrated School: Isaac Lopez Integrated School
2004-07-27	9301	Amending the Philippine Overseas Shipping Development Act or RA 7471
2004-07-27	9302	Amending the Charter of the Philippine Deposit Insurance Corporation or RA 3591
2004-07-30	9303	Establishing a Protected Area: Mount Hamiguitan Range Wildlife Sanctuary Act of 2004
2004-07-30	9304	Establishing a Protected Area: Mount Malindang Range Natural Park Act of 2004
2004-08-02	9305	Creating additional Branches of the Municipal Trial Court
2004-08-02	9306	Creating additional Branches of the Municipal Trial Court
2004-08-02	9307	Creating an additional Branch of the Regional Trial Court
2004-08-02	9308	Creating additional Branches of the Municipal Trial Court
2004-08-04	9309	Creating additional Branches of the Municipal Trial Court
2004-08-04	9310	Creating additional Branches of the Municipal Trial Court
2004-08-07	9311	Converting a State College into a State University: Eastern Visayas State University
2004-08-07	9312	Integrating State Colleges into a State University: Eastern Samar State University
2004-08-07	9313	Integrating State Colleges into a State University: Samar State University
2004-08-07	9314	Converting a college into a State College: Batanes State College
2004-08-08	9315	Telecommunications Franchise: Fiber Telecommunications Incorporated
2004-08-08	9316	Local Exchange Network Franchise: SLL International Cable Specialist Corporation, Inc.
2004-08-08	9317	Local Exchange Network Franchise: Datelcom Corporation
2004-08-08	9318	Radio and Television Broadcasting Franchise: Radio Corporation of the Philippines
2004-08-08	9319	Local Exchange Network Franchise: Claveria Agri-Based Multipurpose Cooperative (CABMPC)
2004-08-08	9320	Amending RA 8597: Expanding the Area of Operation of the Local Exchange Network Franchise
2004-08-08	9321	Telecommunications Franchise: eTELCO, Inc.
2004-08-08	9322	Reclassifying Certain Area of Timberland into Alienable Agricultural Land
2004-08-08	9323	Reclassifying Certain Area of Timberland into Alienable Residential, Commercial, and Industrial Land
2004-08-08	9324	Converting Certain Roads into National Roads
2004-08-08	9325	Converting a Provincial Road to National Road: Malalao National Road
2004-08-08	9326	Converting a Provincial Road to National Road: Bulo National Road
2004-08-08	9327	Converting a Provincial Road to National Road: Rizal National Road
2004-08-08	9328	Converting a Provincial Road to National Road: Lubuagan-Batong Buhay National Road
2004-08-08	9329	Renaming a Road: Bishop Felix Y. Manalo Avenue
2004-08-08	9330	Establishing an Airport: San Antonio Airport
2004-08-08	9331	Renaming a Provincial Office of the PNP: Camp Colonel Joaquin P. Dunuan
2004-08-08	9332	Renaming a Provincial Office of the PNP: Camp Governor Alfredo Kangleon Bantug
2004-09-21	9333	Fixing the Date of Regular Elections of Elective Officials of the Autonomous Region in Muslim Mindanao
2004-12-21	9334	Amending the National Internal Revenue Code of 1997 or RA 8424: On Excise Tax on Distilled Spirits, Wines, Fermented Liquors, Tobacco Products, Cigars, and Cigarettes

=== 2003 (9183–9232) ===
Date approved	RA number	Title/category
2003-01-09	9183	Air Transport Franchise for Domestic and international Service: Asian Spirit, Inc.
2003-01-10	9184	Government Procurement Reform Act
2003-01-16	9185	Water Supply and Sewerage Franchise: Calapan Waterworks System and Development Corporation
2003-01-16	9186	Radio and Television Broadcasting Franchise: Supreme Broadcasting System, Inc.
2003-02-05	9187	Declaring Every June 30 as the Philippine-Spanish Friendship Day
2003-02-10	9188	Amending RA 8186: Increasing the Percentage Distribution of Generals/Flag Officers in the AFP Table of Organization
2003-02-13	9189	The Overseas Absentee Voting Act of 2003
2003-02-21	9190	Recognizing the International Character of Cebu International School
2003-02-21	9191	Declaring Every March 1 a Special Nonworking Holiday in Muntinlupa City in Commemoration of its Cityhood
2003-02-28	9192	Radio and Television Broadcasting Franchise: ACWS-United Broadcasting Network, Inc.
2003-03-06	9193	Declaring Every March 7 a Special Working Holiday in Tagum City in Commemoration of its Foundation
2003-03-07	9194	Amending the Anti-Money Laundering Act of 2001 or RA 9160
2003-03-13	9195	Converting a Provincial Road to National Road: Catanauan-Buenavista National Road
2003-03-13	9196	Converting a Provincial Road to National Road: Abuyon-Buenavista National Road
2003-03-13	9197	Converting a Provincial Road to National Road: Talaba-Summit-Panaon National Road
2003-03-24	9198	Declaring Every March 25 a Special Nonworking Holiday in Candon City in Commemoration of the "Cry of Candon"
2003-03-27	9199	Converting a Provincial Road to National Road: San Francisco-Don Juan Verceles-Maniogan-Tala-San Andres-San Narciso National Road
2003-03-28	9200	Amending the Philippine Geodetic Engineering Act of 1998 or RA 8560
2003-04-01	9201	Declaring December 4 to 10 as National Human Rights Consciousness Week
2003-04-04	9202	Declaring Every August 10 a Special Nonworking Holiday in Maasin City in Commemoration of its Cityhood
2003-04-20	9203	Declaring Every August 15 a Special Nonworking Holiday in the Catarman Municipality in Commemoration of its Foundation
2003-04-20	9204	Amending RA 9094: Changing a Special Working Holiday into a Special Nonworking Holiday in Camiguin
2003-04-20	9205	Declaring Every July 31 a Special Nonworking Holiday in Sagay Municipality in Commemoration of its Foundation
2003-04-23	9206	Appropriations Act of 2003
2003-05-17	9207	Amending Proclamation No. 1826, Series of 1979: National Government Center (NGC) Housing and Land Use Act of 2003
2003-05-26	9208	Anti-Trafficking in Persons Act of 2003
2003-06-09	9209	Electric Power Distribution Franchise: Manila Electric Company (MERALCO)
2003-06-11	9210	Declaring Every June 18 a Special Nonworking Holiday in Naga City in Commemoration of its Cityhood: Repealing RA 9089
2003-06-23	9211	Tobacco Regulation Act of 2003
2003-07-23	9212	Amending the Radio and Television Broadcasting Franchise Renewal of the Consolidated Broadcasting System, Inc. or RA 7582
2003-07-23	9213	Amending the Radio and Television Broadcasting Franchise of the People's Broadcasting Service, Inc. or RA 7477
2003-07-23	9214	Radio and Television Broadcasting Franchise: Newsounds Broadcasting Network, Inc.
2003-07-26	9215	Amending the Air Transport Franchise for Domestic and international Service of Air Philippines Corporation or RA 8339
2003-07-27	9216	Local Exchange Network Franchise: Panay Telephone (PANTELCO II) Corporation II
2003-08-04	9217	Declaring Every April 15 a Special Nonworking Holiday in Capiz Province in Commemoration of the Death of Manuel A. Roxas
2003-08-08	9218	Reconstituting a District Engineering Office
2003-08-08	9219	Establishing a District Engineering Office
2003-08-08	9220	Converting a Sub-District Engineering Office into a District Engineering Office
2003-08-08	9221	Establishing a District Engineering Office
2003-08-08	9222	Converting a Sub-District Engineering Office into a District Engineering Office
2003-08-08	9223	Establishing a District Engineering Office
2003-08-29	9224	Amending the National Internal Revenue Code of 1997 or RA 8424: On the Excise Tax on Automobiles
2003-08-29	9225	Amending Commonwealth Act 63: Citizenship Retention and Re-acquisition Act of 2003
2003-09-11	9226	Converting a Sub-District Engineering Office into a District Engineering Office
2003-10-23	9227	Grant of Special Allowances as Additional Compensation to All Justices, Judges, and Other Positions in the Judiciary
2003-11-28	9228	Establishing a District Engineering Office
2003-12-17	9229	Reapportioning Legislative Districts of Parañaque City
2003-12-18	9230	Amending the Charter of San Jose Del Monte City or RA 8797: Reconstituting its Sangguniang Panlungsod, and Establishing its Own Legislative District
2003-12-19	9231	Amending the Special Protection of Children Against Child Abuse, Exploitation, and Discrimination Act or RA 7610
2003-12-22	9232	Reapportioning Legislative Districts of Antipolo City

=== 2002 (9163–9182) ===
Date approved	RA number	Title/category
2002-01-23	9163	Amending RA 7077 and PD 1706: National Service Training Program (NSTP) Act of 2001
2002-03-19	9164	Amending the Local Government Code of 1991 or RA 7160: Providing for Synchronized Barangay and Sangguniang Kabataan Elections
2002-06-07	9165	Comprehensive Dangerous Drugs Act of 2002: Repealing the Dangerous Drugs Act of 1972 or RA 6425
2002-06-07	9166	Increasing the Base Pay and Other Benefits of the Officers and Enlisted Personnel of the Armed Forces of the Philippines (AFP)
2002-06-07	9167	Creating a Government Agency: Film Development Council of the Philippines
2002-06-07	9168	Philippine Plant Variety Protection Act of 2002
2002-08-01	9169	Radiotelephone Franchise: Seagull Marine Communications Network Corp.
2002-09-04	9170	Amending the Air Transport Franchise for Domestic and international Service of Aboitiz One, Inc. (Formerly, Aboitiz Air Transport Corporation) or RA 7583
2002-09-26	9171	Radio Broadcasting Franchise: Muslim Development Multipurpose Cooperative
2002-10-03	9172	Telecommunications Franchise Renewal with Amendments: Eastern Telecommunications Philippines, Inc. (Eastern Extension Australasia and China Telegraph Company Limited)
2002-10-21	9173	Philippine Nursing Act of 2002: Repealing the Philippine Nursing Act of 1991 or RA 7164
2002-11-07	9174	Amending the Balikbayan Program or RA 6768: Providing Additional Benefits and Privileges to Balikbayans
2002-11-07	9175	Chain Saw Act of 2002
2002-11-13	9176	Amending Commonwealth Act No. 141: Extending, Until December 31, 2020, the Filing of Applications for Administrative Legalization and Judicial Confirmation of Imperfect and Incomplete Titles to Alienable and Disposable Lands of the Public Domain
2002-11-13	9177	Amending the Administrative Code of 1987 or EO 292: the Observance of Eidul Fitr Every Shawwal 1 a National Holiday, and the Observance of Eidul Adha Every Zhul Hijja 10 a Regional Holiday in the ARMM
2002-11-13	9178	Barangay Micro Business Enterprises (BMBEs) Act of 2002
2002-11-13	9179	Renaming an Educational Institution: Basilio B. Chan Memorial Agricultural and Industrial School
2002-12-11	9180	Telecommunications Franchise: Digitel Mobile Phils., Inc.
2002-12-15	9181	Air Transport Franchise for Domestic and international Service: Provincial Airways Corporation
2002-12-23	9182	The Special Purpose Vehicle (SPV) Act of 2002

=== 2001 (8990–9162) ===
Date approved	RA number	Title/category
2001-01-05	8990	Converting a Municipality into a Component City
2001-01-05	8991	Establishing a Protected Area: Batanes Protected Area Act of 2000
2001-01-05	8992	Telecommunications Franchise: Primeworld Digital Systems, Inc.
2001-01-05	8993	Radio and Television Broadcasting Franchise: Palawan Council for Sustainable Development
2001-01-05	8994	Radiotelephone Franchise: Apo Associated Radio Electronics and Communications Company, Inc.
2001-01-05	8995	Radio and Television Broadcasting Franchise: Polytechnic Foundation of Cotabato and Asia, Inc.
2001-01-05	8996	Radio and Television Broadcasting Franchise: End Time Mission Broadcasting Service, Inc.
2001-01-11	8997	Natural Gas Distribution Franchise: First Gas Holdings Corporation
2001-01-17	8998	Establishing a District Engineering Office
2001-01-17	8999	Establishing a District Engineering Office
2001-01-19	9000	Declaring Every March 19 and June 21 as Special Working Holidays in Narra Municipality in Celebration of its Town Fiesta and its Foundation, respectively
2001-01-19	9001	Declaring Every June 19 a Special Working Holiday in the Palawan Province in Celebration of the Feast of Forest
2001-01-21	9002	Telecommunications Franchise: Click Communications, Inc.
2001-01-26	9003	Ecological Solid Waste Management Act of 2000
2001-01-27	9004	Establishing a District Engineering Office
2001-02-02	9005	Converting a Municipality into a Component City
2001-02-12	9006	Fair Election Act
2001-02-21	9007	Appropriation to Fund the Holding of the National and Local Elections in 2001
2001-02-21	9008	Converting a Municipality into a Component City
2001-02-24	9009	Amending the Local Government Code of 1991 or RA 7160: Increasing the Annual Income Requirement for the Conversion of a Municipality into a Component City
2001-02-27	9010	Amending the National Internal Revenue Code of 1997 or RA 8424: Deferring the Imposition of VAT on Certain Services
2001-02-27	9011	Establishing a District Engineering Office
2001-02-38	9012	Amending RA 8953, RA 8753, and RA 8746: Resetting the Date of the Regular Elections for Elective Officials of the ARMM
2001-02-28	9013	Philippine Quality Award Act
2001-02-28	9014	Converting a Municipality into a Component City
2001-02-28	9015	Converting a Municipality into a Component City
2001-02-28	9016	Amending the Charter of Muntinlupa City or RA 7926: Providing for the Composition of its City Council
2001-02-28	9017	Converting a Municipality into a Component City
2001-03-05	9018	Converting a Municipality into a Component City
2001-03-05	9019	Converting a Municipality into a Highly Urbanized City
2001-03-05	9020	Converting a Municipality into a Component City
2001-03-05	9021	Converting a Municipality into a Component City
2001-03-05	9022	Converting a Municipality into a Component City
2001-03-05	9023	Converting a Municipality into a Component City
2001-03-05	9024	Converting a Municipality into a Component City
2001-03-05	9025	Converting a Municipality into a Component City
2001-03-05	9026	Converting a Municipality into a Component City
2001-03-05	9027	Converting a Municipality into a Component City
2001-03-05	9028	Converting a Municipality into a Component City
2001-03-05	9029	Integrating Colleges into a State University: Partido State University (PSU)
2001-03-05	9030	Renaming a Bridge: Narciso Ramos Bridge
2001-03-05	9031	Declaring Every May 27 as a Special Working Holiday in Camarines Sur Province and Cities of Naga and Iriga in Commemoration of (their) Foundation (INFO NEEDED)
2001-03-12	9032	Amending RA 7193: Expanding the Jurisdiction of Culion Municipality
2001-03-12	9033	Converting a Sub-District Engineering Office into a District Engineering Office
2001-03-12	9034	Establishing a District Engineering Office
2001-03-12	9035	Establishing a District Engineering Office
2001-03-12	9036	Amending RA 8496: Strengthening the Governance and Defining the Scope of the Philippine Science High School (PSHS) System
2001-03-13	9037	Establishing a District Engineering Office
2001-03-13	9038	Converting a Sub-District Engineering Office into a District Engineering Office
2001-03-21	9039	Air Transport Franchise for Domestic and international Service: Air Mabuhay Corporation
2001-03-22	9040	The AFP Tax Exemption for Pay and Allowances Act of 2001
2001-03-22	9041	Renaming a Road: Justice Jesus Y. Perez Memorial Highway
2001-03-22	9042	Establishing a District Engineering Office
2001-03-22	9043	Reconstituting a District Engineering Office into Two District Offices
2001-03-22	9044	Radio and Television Broadcasting Franchise: Central Mindanao University
2001-03-22	9045	Integrating Colleges into a State University: Batangas State University (BSU)
2001-03-22	9046	Local Exchange Network Franchise Transfer: West Samar Telecommunications, Inc.
2001-03-22	9047	Amending the Charter of Antipolo City or RA 8508: Increasing its Representative to the Sangguniang Panlalawigan of Rizal from One to Two Members
2001-03-22	9048	Granting Authority to the Civil Registrar and the Consul General to Correct Clerical/Typographical Errors in and Change of a Person's First Name or Nickname
2001-03-22	9049	Granting Monthly Gratuity and Privileges to Awardees of the Medal of Valor
2001-03-30	9050	Establishing a District Engineering Office
2001-03-30	9051	Establishing a District Engineering Office
2001-03-30	9052	Converting a Sub-District Engineering Office into a District Engineering Office
2001-03-30	9053	Philippine Landscape Architecture Act of 2000
2001-03-31	9054	Amending RA 6734: Strengthening and Expanding the Organic Act for the Autonomous Region in Muslim Mindanao
2001-04-04	9055	Converting a State College into a State University: Aklan State University
2001-04-04	9056	Establishing a National High School: Lingayao National High School
2001-04-04	9057	Establishing a National High School: Durian National High School
2001-04-04	9058	Establishing a National High School: Marcos Calo National High School
2001-04-04	9059	Converting a High School Annex into an Independent National High School: Maningalao National High School
2001-04-04	9060	Converting a High School Annex into an Independent National High School: Mat-I National High School
2001-04-04	9061	Establishing a National High School: Sumile National High School
2001-04-05	9062	Radio and Television Broadcasting Franchise: Media One Broadcasting Corporation
2001-04-05	9063	Radio and Television Broadcasting Franchise: Ranao Radio Broadcasting and TV System Corporation
2001-04-05	9064	National Athletes, Coaches, and Trainers Benefits and Incentives Act of 2001 (Also known as the Sports Benefits and Incentives Act of 2001)
2001-04-05	9065	Converting a Sub-District Engineering Office into a District Engineering Office
2001-04-05	9066	Reconstituting a District Engineering Office(s)
2001-04-08	9067	Declaring Every April 15 as Special Working Holiday in Capiz Province in Observation of the President Manuel A. Roxas Day
2001-04-08	9068	Declaring Every November 5 as Regular Working Holiday in Ormoc City in Commemoration of the November 5, 1991, Tragedy
2001-04-08	9069	Declaring Every May 14 as Special Working Holiday in Obando Municipality in Commemoration of its Foundation
2001-04-08	9070	Declaring Every December 18 as Special Working Holiday in Observation of Graciano Lopez-Jaena Day
2001-04-08	9071	Declaring Every June 13 as Special Working Holiday in Occidental Mindoro Province in Commemoration of its Foundation
2001-04-08	9072	National Caves and Cave Resources Management and Protection Act`
2001-04-08	9073	Establishing a National High School: Bartolome and Manuela Pañares Memorial National High School
2001-04-08	9074	Establishing a National High School: Moalboal National High School
2001-04-08	9075	Establishing a National High School: Toribio Minor National High School
2001-04-08	9076	Establishing a National High School: Judge Edmundo S. Pinga National High School
2001-04-08	9077	Establishing a National High School: Tictapul National High School
2001-04-08	9078	Establishing a National High School: Sibulao National High School
2001-04-08	9079	Establishing a National High School: Divisoria National High School
2001-04-08	9080	Establishing a National High School: Tolosa National High School
2001-04-08	9081	Establishing a National High School: Limaong National High School
2001-04-08	9082	Establishing a Science High School: Ifugao Provincial Science High School
2001-04-08	9083	Establishing a National Science and Technology High School: Santa Rosa Science and Technology High School
2001-04-08	9084	Establishing a National High School: Umiray National High School
2001-04-08	9085	Converting a High School Annex into an Independent National High School: Onica National High School
2001-04-08	9086	Converting a High School Annex into an Independent National High School: Bedbed National High School
2001-04-08	9087	Converting a High School Annex into an Independent National High School: Cabiten National High School
2001-04-08	9088	Declaring Every March 17 as Special Working Holiday in Balamban Municipality in Commemoration of the Death Anniversary of Ramon B. Magsaysay Sr.
2001-04-08	9089	Declaring Every December 15 as Special Working Holiday in Naga City in Commemoration of its Cityhood
2001-04-08	9090	Declaring Every February 1 as Special Working Holiday in Camarines Norte Province in Commemoration of the Birth of Jose Maria C. Panganiban
2001-04-08	9091	Declaring Every May 28 as Special Working Holiday in Imus Municipality in Commemoration of the Labanan sa Alapan
2001-04-08	9092	Declaring Every September 3 as Special Working Holiday in Imus Municipality in Commemoration of the Labanan sa Imus
2001-04-08	9093	Declaring Every March 16 as Special Working Holiday in Tagbilaran City in Commemoration of the Blood Compact with the Spaniards by Datu Sikatuna
2001-04-08	9094	Declaring Every January 7 as Special Working Holiday in Camiguin Province in Commemoration of its Foundation
2001-04-08	9095	Establishing a National High School: Proper Dimaya National High School
2001-04-08	9096	Converting a High School into a National High School: San Juan National High School
2001-04-08	9097	Establishing a National High School: Sogod National High School
2001-04-08	9098	Establishing a National High School: Tucod National High School
2001-04-08	9099	Converting a High School Annex into an Independent National High School: Margen National High School
2001-04-08	9100	Renaming a Road: Don Juan Sumulong Avenue
2001-04-09	9101	Local Exchange Network Franchise: Tupi Telephone Cooperative, Inc.
2001-04-09	9102	Amending RA 8597: Expanding the Area of Operation of the Local Exchange Network Franchise of Southern Telecommunications Company, Inc.
2001-04-09	9103	Air Transport Franchise for Domestic and international Service: Laoag International Airlines, Inc.
2001-04-09	9104	Amending RA 8597: Expanding the Area of Operation of the Local Exchange Network Franchise of Samartel, Inc.
2001-04-14	9105	Art Forgery Act of 2001
2001-04-14	9106	Establishing a Protected Area: Sagay Marine Reserve Act
2001-04-14	9107	Philippine Science Heritage Center Act
2001-04-14	9108	Establishing a National High School: SouthCom National High School
2001-04-14	9109	Establishing a National High School: San Juan National High School
2001-04-14	9110	Establishing a National High School: Baluno National High School
2001-04-14	9111	Converting a High School Annex into an Independent National High School: Kamasi National High School
2001-04-14	9112	Converting a High School Annex into an Independent National High School: Marbel National High School
2001-04-14	9113	Converting a High School Annex into an Independent National High School: Sangley Point National High School
2001-04-14	9114	Converting a Barangay High School into a National High School: Binucayan National High School
2001-04-15	9115	Radio and Television Broadcasting Franchise: Community Media Network Incorporated
2001-04-15	9116	Telecommunications Franchise: Solid Broadband Corporation
2001-04-15	9117	Local Exchange Network Franchise: Battlex, Inc (Bataan Telephone Exchange)
2001-04-19	9118	Declaring Every March 1 a Special Working Holiday in Muntinlupa City in Commemoration of its Cityhood
2001-04-20	9119	Radio and Television Broadcasting Franchise: Benguet Broadcasting Corporation
2001-04-20	9120	Reclassifying Certain Area of Timberland into Alienable and Disposable Land: Ramesamey/Cowrie Island
2001-04-20	9121	Radio and Television Broadcasting Franchise: Weblink Multivision, Inc.
2001-04-20	9122	Amending RA 8483: On the Tax Provision for the Local Exchange Network Franchise of Camiguin Telephone Cooperative
2001-04-20	9123	Radio Broadcasting Franchise: DawnBreakers Foundation, Inc.
2001-04-20	9124	Radio Broadcasting Franchise: Zenith Telecommunications Company, Inc.
2001-04-22	9125	Establishing a Protected Area: Northern Sierra Madre Natural Park (NSMNP) Act of 2001
2001-04-24	9126	Establishing a National High School: Pangao-An National High School
2001-04-24	9127	Radio and Television Broadcasting Franchise: UBC Media, Inc (Also known as Love Radio Network)
2001-04-24	9128	Radio and Television Broadcasting Franchise: Calvary Gospel Tabernacle, Inc.
2001-04-24	9129	Radio and Television Broadcasting Franchise: Sea and Sky Broadcasting, Inc.
2001-04-24	9130	Telecommunications Franchise: Connectivity Unlimited Resource Enterprises, Inc.
2001-04-24	9131	Radio and Television Broadcasting Franchise: Iddes Broadcast Group, Inc.
2001-04-24	9132	Amending RA 8690: Expanding the Area of Operation of the Local Exchange Network Franchise of Santos Telephone Corporation, Inc.
2001-04-24	9133	Local Exchange Network Franchise: Pampanga Telephone Company, Inc.
2001-04-26	9134	Reclassifying Certain Area of Reservation into Alienable Agricultural Land
2001-04-27	9135	Amending PD 1464 or the Tariff and Customs Code of the Philippines
2001-06-08	9136	Electric Power Industry Reform Act of 2001
2001-06-08	9137	Supplemental Appropriations Act for 2001
2001-06-08	9138	Integrating Colleges into a State College: Guimaras State College
2001-06-08	9139	The Administrative Naturalization Act of 2000
2001-06-22	9140	Fixing the Date of the Plebiscite for Approval of the Amendments under RA 9054
2001-07-03	9141	Converting a college into a State College: Negros State College of Agriculture (NSCA)
2001-07-20	9142	Converting a college into a State College: Zamboanga City State Polytechnic College
2001-07-30	9143	Converting an Elementary School into a National High School: Bonifacio Javier National High School
2001-07-30	9144	Converting an Elementary School into an Integrated School: Andres Bonifacio Integrated School
2001-07-30	9145	Reclassifying Certain Area of Timberland into Alienable Agricultural Land
2001-07-30	9146	Converting a college into a State College: Northwestern Mindanao State College of Science and Technology: Repealing RA 4878
2001-07-30	9147	Wildlife Resources Conservation and Protection Act
2001-07-31	9148	Radio Broadcasting Franchise: Hypersonic Broadcasting Center, Inc.
2001-07-31	9149	Radio Broadcasting Franchise: H. E. Baldo Incorporated
2001-08-06	9150	Amending RA 8293 or the Intellectual Property Code of the Philippines: Protecting Layout-Designs (Topographis) of Integrated Circuits
2001-08-10	9151	Renaming the Apiculture Training and Development Center into the National Apiculture Research, Training and Development Institute
2001-08-10	9152	Converting an Elementary School Annex into an Independent Elementary School: Kapitan Jose Cardones Memorial Elementary School
2001-08-10	9153	Converting an Elementary School Annex into an Independent Elementary School: Kapitan Eddie T. Reyes Memorial Elementary School
2001-08-11	9154	Establishing a Protected Area: Mount Kanla-on Natural Park (MKNP) Act of 2001
2001-08-11	9155	Governance of Basic Education Act of 2001
2001-08-11	9156	Renaming an Educational Institution: Bondoc Peninsula Technological Institute
2001-08-11	9157	Integrating State Colleges into a State University: University of Rizal System
2001-08-11	9158	Converting a State College into a State University: Leyte State University
2001-08-11	9159	Converting a college into a State College: J. H. Cerilles State College
2001-09-29	9160	Anti-Money Laundering Act of 2001
2001-12-22	9161	Rental Reform Act of 2002
2001-12-22	9162	Appropriations Act of 2002

=== 2000 (8759–8989) ===
Date approved	RA number	Title/category
2000-02-14	8759	Public Employment Service Office Act of 1999
2000-02-16	8760	Appropriations Act of 2000
2000-02-15	8761	Amending RA 8424 or the Tax Reform Act of 1997: On the Transitory Provisions for the Imposition of VAT on Certain Services
2000-03-07	8762	Retail Trade Liberalization Act of 2000: Repealing RA 1180
2000-03-07	8763	Home Guaranty Corporation Act of 2000: Consolidating Laws Regarding the Home Insurance and Guaranty Corporation
2000-03-28	8764	Establishing a National High School: Bagabag National High School
2000-03-28	8765	Establishing a National High School: Kalipay National High School
2000-03-28	8766	Establishing a National High School: Loctuga National High School
2000-03-28	8767	Converting a High School into a National High School: Don Servillano Platon Memorial National High School
2000-03-28	8768	Converting a High School into a National High School: Pambuhan National High School
2000-03-28	8769	Converting a High School Annex into an Independent High School: Mandaluyong East High School
2000-03-28	8770	Converting a National High School into a National Comprehensive High School: Barcelona National Comprehensive High School
2000-03-28	8771	Converting a High School into a National High School: Maparat National High School
2000-03-28	8772	Converting a High School Annex into an Independent National High School: Calamba National High School
2000-03-28	8773	Converting a High School Annex into an Independent National High School: Kinama National High School
2000-03-28	8774	Converting a High School Annex into an Independent National High School: Cuyago National High School
2000-04-07	8775	Establishing a National High School: Mayor Guillermo Barsatan Memorial School of Arts and Trades
2000-04-07	8776	Establishing a National High School: Mayor Ricardo De San Jose Sr. Comprehensive National High School
2000-04-07	8777	Establishing a National High School: Monreal National High School
2000-04-07	8778	Establishing a National High School: Cerdena National High School
2000-04-27	8779	Establishing a National High School: San Luis National High School
2000-04-27	8780	Establishing a National High School: Calinog National Comprehensive High School
2000-04-27	8781	Establishing a National High School: Batad National High School
2000-04-27	8782	Converting a High School Annex into an Independent National High School: Pulungmasle National High School
2000-04-27	8783	Converting a High School Annex into an Independent National High School: Burgos National High School
2000-04-27	8784	Converting a High School Annex into an Independent National High School: Dominador Abang Memorial National High School
2000-04-27	8785	Converting a High School into a National High School: Cudal National High School
2000-05-03	8786	Establishing a National High School: Marcela T. Mabanta Memorial National High School
2000-05-03	8787	Establishing a National High School: David M. Puzon Memorial National High School
2000-05-03	8788	Establishing a National High School: Santol Vocational High School
2000-05-03	8789	Converting a High School Annex into an Independent National High School: Roberto Sato National High School
2000-05-03	8790	Converting a High School Annex into an Independent National High School: Ivana National High School
2000-05-23	8791	The General Banking Act of 2000
2000-06-14	8792	Electronic Commerce Act
2000-06-27	8793	Converting a Sub-District Engineering Office into a District Engineering Office
2000-06-27	8794	Motor Vehicle User's Charge Imposition
2000-06-27	8795	Renaming a Bridge: Marcelo B. Fernan Bridge
2000-07-11	8796	Converting a Municipality into a Component City
2000-07-15	8797	Converting a Municipality into a Component City
2000-07-15	8798	Converting a Municipality into a Component City
2000-07-19	8799	The Securities Regulation Code
2000-07-19	8800	Safeguard Measures Act: Providing Measures to Protect Local Industries from Increased Importation
2000-07-19	8801	Declaring Every May 19 a Special Working Holiday in Butuan City in Celebration of its Annual Fiesta
2000-07-19	8802	Declaring Every August 2 a Special Working Holiday in Butuan City in Commemoration of its Cityhood
2000-08-16	8803	Converting a Municipality into a Component City
2000-08-16	8804	Converting a Municipality into a Component City
2000-08-16	8805	Converting a Municipality into a Component City
2000-08-16	8806	Merging Municipalities into a City: Sorsogon City
2000-08-16	8807	Converting a Municipality into a Component City
2000-08-16	8808	Converting a High School Annex into an Independent National High School: Cadaratan National High School
2000-08-16	8809	Amending RA 8461: Fixing Incorrect Location of the Philippine Science High School Lanao del Norte Campus
2000-08-16	8810	Converting a Sub-District Engineering Office into a District Engineering Office
2000-08-16	8811	Transferring Municipal/City Location of the Capital of a Province
2000-08-21	8812	Declaring Every July 1 a Special Working Holiday in Dipolog City in Commemoration of its Foundation
2000-08-21	8813	Declaring Every March 22 a Special Working Holiday in Malaybalay City in Commemoration of its Cityhood
2000-08-21	8814	Declaring Every February 9 a Special Working Holiday in Mandaluyong in Commemoration of its Liberation from Japanese Occupation
2000-08-21	8815	Amending RA 7552: Explicit Inclusion of a City/Municipality in the Observation of a Holiday
2000-08-22	8816	Establishing a National High School: Panaon National High School
2000-08-22	8817	Establishing a National High School: San Isidro National High School
2000-08-22	8818	Establishing a National High School: Mimbunga National High School
2000-08-22	8819	Establishing a National High School: Malinao National High School
2000-08-22	8820	Establishing a National High School: Linao National High School
2000-08-22	8821	Establishing a National High School
2000-08-22	8822	Establishing a National High School: Dolores National High School
2000-08-22	8823	Establishing a National High School: Lim-ao National High School
2000-08-22	8824	Converting a High School into an Agro-Industrial High School: Nambaran Agro-Industrial National High School
2000-08-22	8825	Converting a High School into a National High School: Calaccad National High School
2000-08-22	8826	Establishing a National High School: Balawag National High School
2000-08-22	8827	Converting a High School Annex into an Independent National High School: Magtoma Pangol National High School
2000-08-22	8828	Converting a High School Annex into an Independent National High School: Allaguia National High School
2000-08-22	8829	Converting a High School into a National High School: Calawag National High School
2000-08-22	8830	Converting a High School into a National High School: Candawaga National High School
2000-08-22	8831	Establishing a National High School: Quezon-Panitian National High School
2000-08-22	8832	Converting a High School into a National High School: Cabayugan National High School
2000-08-22	8833	Establishing a National High School: Calategas National High School
2000-08-22	8834	Converting a High School into a National High School: Macarascas National High School
2000-08-22	8835	Converting a High School into a National High School: Maasin National High School
2000-08-22	8836	Establishing a National High School: Camantang National High School
2000-08-22	8837	Converting a High School into a National High School: Maslog National High School
2000-08-22	8838	Converting a High School into a National High School: Hinolaso National High School
2000-08-22	8839	Establishing a National High School: Kapangan Central National High School
2000-08-22	8840	Changing the Name of a National High School: Twin Peaks National High School
2000-08-22	8841	Converting a High School Annex into an Independent National High School: Fianza Memorial National High School
2000-08-22	8842	Establishing a National High School: Sitero Francisco Memorial National High School
2000-08-22	8843	Converting a High School into a National Science and Technology High School: Raja Soliman Science and Technology High School
2000-08-22	8844	Converting a High School into a National High School: Dr. Arcadio Santos National High School
2000-08-22	8845	Establishing a National High School: Bagumbayan National High School
2000-08-22	8846	Establishing a National High School: Tipas National High School
2000-08-22	8847	Converting a High School into a National High School: Union National High School
2000-08-22	8848	Converting a High School into a National High School: San Pedro National High School
2000-08-22	8849	Converting a High School into a National High School: Jose De Villa National High School
2000-08-22	8850	Converting a High School into a National High School: La Salvacion National High School
2000-08-22	8851	Converting a High School into a National High School: Goa National High School
2000-08-22	8852	Establishing a National Agro-Industrial High School: Sibaguan Agro-Industrial High School
2000-08-22	8853	Converting a High School Annex into an Independent National High School: Medrozo-Mendoza National High School
2000-08-22	8854	Converting a High School Annex into an Independent National High School: Batanes General Comprehensive High School
2000-08-22	8855	Converting a National High School into a National Science High School: Batanes National Science High School
2000-08-22	8856	Converting a High School Annex into an Independent National High School: Catalino M. Prado National High School
2000-08-22	8857	Establishing a National High School: Jose Feliciano Menez Memorial National High School
2000-08-22	8858	Establishing a National High School: Tubod (San Fernando) National High School
2000-08-22	8859	Converting a High School Annex into an Independent National High School: Perelos National High School
2000-08-22	8860	Establishing a National High School: Santa Ana National High School
2000-08-22	8861	Converting a High School Annex into an Independent National High School: San Basilio National High School
2000-08-22	8862	Establishing a National High School: Kakiduguen National High School
2000-08-22	8863	Establishing a National High School: Bascaran National High School
2000-08-22	8864	Establishing a National High School: Camayaan National High School
2000-08-22	8865	Converting a High School into a National High School: Bilar National High School
2000-08-22	8866	Establishing a National High School: Mayor Bartolome Serut National Agricultural and Trade High School
2000-08-22	8867	Converting a High School Annex into an Independent National High School: Cal-Owan Agricultural and Vocational National High School
2000-08-22	8868	Establishing a National High School: Sagada National High School
2000-08-22	8869	Establishing a National High School: Besao National High School
2000-08-22	8870	Converting a High School Annex into an Independent National High School: Betwagan National High School
2000-08-22	8871	Converting a High School Annex into an Independent National High School: Guinaang National High School
2000-08-22	8872	Converting a High School Annex into an Independent National High School: Namatec National High School
2000-08-22	8873	Converting a High School Annex into an Independent National High School: Albago National High School
2000-08-22	8874	Converting a High School Annex into an Independent National High School: Talubin National High School
2000-08-22	8875	Converting a High School Annex into an Independent National High School: Banao National High School
2000-08-22	8876	Establishing a National High School: Alberto Sorongon Sr. Memorial National High School
2000-08-22	8877	Establishing a National High School: Ilongbukid National High School
2000-08-22	8878	Establishing a National High School: Panuran National High School
2000-08-22	8879	Establishing a National High School: Miag-ao National High School
2000-08-22	8880	Establishing a National High School: Jose Facultad Memorial National High School
2000-08-22	8881	Establishing a National High School: Valverde National High School
2000-08-22	8882	Establishing a National High School: Igtalongon National High School
2000-08-22	8883	Establishing a National High School: Pitogo National High School
2000-08-22	8884	Establishing a National High School: Tabugon National High School
2000-08-22	8885	Establishing a National High School: Leon National High School
2000-08-22	8886	Establishing a National High School: Dumangas National High School
2000-08-22	8887	Establishing a National High School: Nazuni Summit Comprehensive National High School
2000-08-22	8888	Establishing a National High School: Barotac Nuevo Comprehensive High School
2000-08-22	8889	Establishing a National High School: Salihid National High School
2000-08-22	8890	Establishing a National High School: Gabaldon Vocational Agriculture High School
2000-08-22	8891	Converting a High School Annex into an Independent National High School: Teodoro A. Dionisio National High School
2000-08-22	8892	Converting a High School Annex into an Independent National High School: Maruhat National High School
2000-08-22	8893	Establishing a National High School: Mataguisi Comprehensive National High School
2000-08-22	8894	Establishing a National High School: Gov. Benjamin Leguiab Sr. Memorial National High School
2000-08-22	8895	Establishing a National High School: Marag Valley Agricultural and Trade High School
2000-08-22	8896	Converting a High School Department into an Independent National High School: Apayao Science High School
2000-08-22	8897	Converting a High School into a National High School: Lucena National High School
2000-08-22	8898	Converting a High School into a National High School: Prosperidad National High School
2000-08-22	8899	Converting a High School into a National High School: Santa Cruz National High School
2000-08-22	8900	Converting a High School into a National High School: Libertad National High School
2000-08-22	8901	Converting a High School Annex into an Independent National High School: Guadalupe National High School
2000-08-22	8902	Converting a High School Annex into an Independent National High School: Bunawan National High School
2000-08-22	8903	Converting a High School Annex into an Independent National High School: Santa Irene National High School
2000-08-22	8904	Converting a High School Annex into an Independent National High School: J. Marquez National High School
2000-08-22	8905	Converting a High School Annex into an Independent National High School: Datu Ayunan National High School
2000-08-22	8906	Establishing a National High School: Cotabato City National High School (NOTE: Re-establishing)
2000-08-22	8907	Establishing a National High School: Tantangan National Trade High School
2000-08-22	8908	Establishing a National High School: Lower Bala National High School
2000-08-22	8909	Establishing a National High School: Managa National High School
2000-08-22	8910	Establishing a National High School: Diosdado Yap Sr. National High School
2000-08-22	8911	Establishing a National High School: Linamon National High School
2000-08-22	8912	Establishing a National High School: Sultan Gumander National High School
2000-08-22	8913	Converting a High School Annex into an Independent National High School: Angoyao National High School
2000-08-22	8914	Converting a High School into a National High School: San Martin Agro-Industrial National High School
2000-08-22	8915	Establishing a National High School: Kuya National High School
2000-08-22	8916	Converting a High School Annex into an Independent National High School: Bacuag National Agro-Industrial School
2000-08-22	8917	Establishing a National High School: Plaridel National High School
2000-08-22	8918	Converting a High School Annex into an Independent National High School: Sitangkai National High School
2000-08-22	8919	Converting a High School Annex into an Independent National High School: Lison Valley National High School
2000-08-22	8920	Converting a High School into a National High School: Bayabas National High School
2000-08-22	8921	Converting a High School into a National High School: Tambongon National High School
2000-08-22	8922	Converting a High School into a National High School: Paloc National High School
2000-08-22	8923	Converting a High School Annex into an Independent National High School: Anitapan National High School
2000-08-22	8924	Converting a High School into a National High School: Mainit National High School
2000-08-22	8925	Converting a High School Annex into an Independent National High School: Araibo National High School
2000-08-22	8926	Converting a High School Annex into an Independent National High School: Kapatagan National High School
2000-08-22	8927	Establishing a National High School: Caoayan National High School
2000-08-22	8928	Establishing a National High School: Tagudin National High School
2000-08-22	8929	Establishing a National High School: Santa Maria National High School
2000-08-22	8930	Establishing a National High School: Salcedo National High School
2000-08-22	8931	Establishing a National High School: Cervantes National High School
2000-08-22	8932	Establishing a National High School: Catubig Valley National High School
2000-08-22	8933	Establishing a National High School: Nereo R. Joaquin National High School
2000-08-22	8934	Establishing a National High School: Calubcob I National High School
2000-08-22	8935	Establishing a National High School: Palanas National Agriculture High School
2000-08-22	8936	Establishing a National High School: Matagangtang National High School
2000-08-22	8937	Converting a High School into a National High School: Panique National High School
2000-08-22	8938	Establishing a National High School: Amungan National High School
2000-08-22	8939	Establishing a National High School: Ubao National High School
2000-08-22	8940	Establishing a National High School: Piat National High School
2000-08-22	8941	Converting a High School Annex into an Independent National High School: Manguisoc National High School
2000-08-22	8942	Converting a High School Annex into an Independent National High School: San Pablo National High School
2000-08-22	8943	Converting a High School Annex into an Independent National High School: Nagtipunan National High School
2000-08-22	8944	Converting a Science High School into a National Science High School: Naga City Science High School
2000-08-24	8945	Declaring Every March 20 a Special Working Holiday in San Fernando City in Commemoration of its Foundation
2000-08-31	8946	Establishing a National High School: Centrala National High School
2000-08-31	8947	Establishing a National High School: Mostro National High School
2000-08-31	8948	Establishing a National High School: Sinawilan National High School
2000-08-31	8949	Amending RA 8734: Correcting a Misidentification of the Former Main Campus of a New Independent High School
2000-08-31	8950	Converting a High School Annex into an Independent National High School: Cawagayan National High School
2000-08-31	8951	Converting a Sub-District Engineering Office into a District Engineering Office
2000-08-31	8952	Amending RA 7698: Explicit Inclusion of a City/Municipality in the Observation of a Holiday
2000-09-01	8953	Fixing the Date of Regular Elections of Elective Officials of the Autonomous Region in Muslim Mindanao
2000-09-02	8954	Radio and Television Broadcasting Franchise: Intercontinental Broadcasting Corporation
2000-09-02	8955	Telecommunications Franchise: Polaris Telecommunications, Inc.
2000-09-02	8956	Local Exchange Network Franchise: Odiongan Telephone Corporation
2000-09-04	8957	Converting a Sub-District Engineering Office into a District Engineering Office
2000-09-04	8958	Converting a Sub-District Engineering Office into a District Engineering Office
2000-09-07	8959	Local Exchange Network Franchise: Palawan Telephone Company, Inc.
2000-09-07	8960	Electric Power Distribution Franchise Renewal: Davao Light and Power Company, Inc.
2000-09-07	8961	Local Exchange Network Franchise: L.M. United Telephone Company, Inc.
2000-09-07	8962	Local Exchange Network Franchise: Iriga Telephone Company, Inc.
2000-09-09	8963	Reclassifying Certain Area of Reservation into Alienable and Disposable Land
2000-09-16	8964	Converting a High School Annex into an Independent National High School: Santa Cruz National High School
2000-09-16	8965	Converting a Sub-District Engineering Office into a District Engineering Office
2000-09-20	8966	Converting a High School Department into an Independent National High School: Magallanes National High School (Relocation)
2000-09-25	8967	Converting a High School Annex into an Independent National High School: Western Kalinga National High School
2000-10-04	8968	Renaming a Road: Governor Felix A. Fuentebella National Highway
2000-10-27	8969	Declaring Every Third Friday of August a Special Working Holiday in Davao City
2000-10-31	8970	Prohibition of the Manufacture, Importation, Distribution and Sale of Laundry and Industrial Detergents Containing Hard Surfactants
2000-10-31	8971	Renaming a Road(s): Jose D. Aspiras Highway and Ben Palispis Highway
2000-11-07	8972	Solo Parents' Welfare Act of 2000
2000-11-07	8973	Creating a Province: Zamboanga Sibugay
2000-11-07	8974	Expediting Implementation and Completion of Government Infrastructure Projects: Facilitation of the Acquisition of the Right-of-Way, Site, or Location
2000-11-07	8975	Expediting Implementation and Completion of Government Infrastructure Projects: Prohibition of Lower Courts from Issuing TROs, or Injunctions
2000-11-07	8976	Philippine Food Fortification Act of 2000
2000-11-07	8977	Converting a Municipality into a Component City
2000-11-09	8978	Establishing a Protected Area: Mount Kitanglad Range Protected Area Act of 2000
2000-11-22	8979	Converting a Municipality into a Component City
2000-12-05	8980	Early Childhood Care and Development (ECCD) Act
2000-12-05	8981	Professional Regulation Commission (PRC) Modernization Act of 2000
2000-12-05	8982	Amending RA 8982: Expanding the Area of Operation of the Local Exchange Network Franchise: Ipil Telephone Company, Inc.
2000-12-05	8983	Converting a Municipality into a Component City
2000-12-05	8984	Converting a Municipality into a Component City
2000-12-05	8985	Converting a Municipality into a Component City
2000-12-09	8986	Declaring Every March 21 a Special Working Holiday in Calapan City in Commemoration of its Foundation
2000-12-12	8987	Converting a Sub-District Engineering Office into a District Engineering Office
2000-12-27	8988	Recognition of a Spanish Royal Decree Creating Vigan a City
2000-12-31	8989	Amending RA 7820: Streamlining the Organization of the Partido Development Administration

=== 1999 (8746–8758) ===
Date approved	RA number	Title/category
1999-03-04	8746	Fixing the Date of Regular Elections of Elective Officials of the Autonomous Region in Muslim Mindanao
1999-06-01	8747	Philippine Year 2000 Disclosure and Readiness Act
1999-06-01	8748	Amending the Special Economic Zone Act of 1995 or RA 7916
1999-06-23	8749	Philippine Clean Air Act of 1999
1999-08-05	8750	Seat Belts Use Act of 1999
1999-08-07	8751	Strengthening the Mechanism of Countervailing Duties' Imposition: Providing Measures to Protect Local Industries from Increased Importation
1999-08-12	8752	Anti-Dumping Act of 1999: Providing Measures to Protect Local Industries from Increased Importation
1999-09-08	8753	Fixing the Date of Regular Elections of Elective Officials of the Autonomous Region in Muslim Mindanao
1999-11-04	8754	Converting a Municipality into a Component City
1999-11-04	8755	Converting a Municipality into a Component City
1999-11-23	8756	Amending the Omnibus Investments Code of 1987 or EO 226: Providing for the Terms, Conditions, and Licensing Requirements of Headquarters and Warehouses of Multinational Companies
1999-11-25	8757	Establishing the Philippine Sports Hall of Fame
1999-12-28	8758	Amending RA 7181: Extending the Term of the Committee on Privatization and the Asset Privatization Trust

=== 1998 (8446–8745) ===
Date approved	RA number	Title/category
1998-01-05	8446	Horse Racing Franchise: Fil-Asia Racing Club
1998-01-08	8447	Establishing a National High School: Los Arcos National High School
1998-01-09	8448	Converting a State College Campus into a Separate State College: Northern Negros State College of Science and Technology
1998-01-11	8449	Local Exchange Network Franchise: Marbel Telephone System, Inc.
1998-01-10	8450	Local Exchange Network Franchise: Southern Telecommunications Company, Inc.
1998-01-10	8451	Radio and Television Broadcasting Franchise: Baganian Broadcasting Corporation
1998-01-11	8452	Declaring Every July 12 as a Special Nonworking Holiday in Laguindingan Municipality in Commemoration of its Foundation
1998-01-11	8453	Establishing a National High School: Naval National High School
1998-01-19	8454	Upgrading a Hospital to Tertiary Level: Batanes General Hospital
1998-01-19	8455	Establishing a High School: San Joaquin/Kalawaan High School
1998-01-19	8456	Establishing a National High School: Bagacay National High School
1998-01-19	8457	Establishing a National High School: Barangay Elizalde National High School
1998-01-19	8458	Establishing a National High School: Tayasan National High School
1998-01-19	8459	Establishing a National High School: Balasan National High School
1998-01-19	8460	Establishing a National High School: Concepcion National High School
1998-01-19	8461	Establishing a National Science High School: Philippine Science High School Lanao Del Norte Campus
1998-01-19	8462	Establishing a National High School: La Paz National High School
1998-01-19	8463	Establishing a National High School: San Luis National High School
1998-01-19	8464	Establishing a National High School: Kapalangan National High School
1998-01-19	8465	Establishing a National High School: Vicente B. Ylagan National High School
1998-01-19	8466	Establishing a National High School: Mabalacat National High School
1998-01-19	8467	Establishing a National High School: Baco National High School
1998-01-22	8468	Converting a State College into a State University: Cavite State University
1998-01-30	8469	Converting a Municipality into a Component City
1998-01-30	8470	Creating a Province: Compostela Valley
1998-01-30	8471	Merging Municipalities into a City: Samal City
1998-01-30	8472	Converting a Municipality into a Component City
1998-01-30	8473	Creating a Municipality: Braulio E. Dujali
1998-02-02	8474	Converting a Municipality into a Component City
1998-02-02	8475	Converting a Municipality into a Component City
1998-02-06	8476	Radio and Television Broadcasting Franchise: Katigbak Enterprises (San Pablo City) Incorporated
1998-02-06	8477	Satellite Earth Station Franchise: H.T. Telesis, Inc.
1998-02-07	8478	Converting a Sub-District Engineering Office into a District Engineering Office
1998-02-10	8479	Downstream Oil Industry Deregulation Act of 1998
1998-02-10	8480	Converting a Municipality into a Component City
1998-02-10	8481	Converting a High School into an Arts and Trade School: Camiguin School of Arts and Trade
1998-02-10	8482	Upgrading a Hospital to Tertiary Level: Camiguin General Hospital
1998-02-10	8483	Local Exchange Network Franchise: Camiguin Telephone Cooperative
1998-02-11	8484	Access Devices Regulation Act of 1998
1998-02-11	8485	Animal Welfare Act of 1998
1998-02-11	8486	Cotton Industry Development Act of 1998
1998-02-11	8487	Converting a Municipality into a Highly Urbanized City
1998-02-11	8488	Converting a Municipality into a Component City
1998-02-11	8489	Converting a Municipality into a Component City
1998-02-11	8490	Converting a Municipality into a Component City
1998-02-12	8491	Flag and Heraldic Code of the Philippines
1998-02-12	8492	National Museum Act of 1998
1998-02-12	8493	Speedy Trial Act of 1998
1998-02-12	8494	Amending PD 1080: Reorganizing the Philippine Export and Foreign Loan Guarantee Corporation into the Trade and Investment Development Corporation of the Philippines
1998-02-12	8495	Philippine Mechanical Engineering Act of 1998: Repealing Commonwealth Act 294
1998-02-12	8496	Philippine Science High School (PSHS) System Act of 1997
1998-02-12	8497	Establishing a Science High School: City of Mandaluyong Science High School
1998-02-12	8498	Integrating Colleges into a State University: Ramon Magsaysay Technological University
1998-02-12	8499	Establishing a School of Arts and Trades: Gonzalo Puyat School of Arts and Trades
1998-02-12	8500	Converting a Municipality into a Component City
1998-02-13	8501	Housing Loan Condonation Act of 1998
1998-02-13	8502	Jewelry Industry Development Act of 1998
1998-02-13	8503	Health Research and Development Act of 1998
1998-02-13	8504	Philippines AIDS Prevention and Control Act of 1998
1998-02-13	8505	Rape Victim Assistance and Protection Act of 1998
1998-02-13	8506	Banning the Registration and Operation of Vehicles with Right-Hand Steering Wheel
1998-02-13	8507	Converting a Municipality into a Highly Urbanized City
1998-02-13	8508	Converting a Municipality into a Component City
1998-02-13	8509	Converting a Municipality into a Component City
1998-02-13	8510	Telecommunications Franchise: Textron Corporation
1998-02-13	8511	Horse Racing Franchise: Starland Racing Corporation
1998-02-13	8512	Establishing a National High School: Motiong National High School
1998-02-13	8513	Establishing a National High School: Commonwealth National High School
1998-02-13	8514	Establishing a National High School: Bubuan National High School
1998-02-13	8515	Establishing a National High School: Jimenez National Comprehensive High School
1998-02-13	8516	Establishing a National High School: Banayoyo National High School
1998-02-13	8517	Converting a High School Annex into an Independent National High School: Kalabugao National High School
1998-02-13	8518	Converting a High School into a National High School: Irawan National High School
1998-02-13	8519	Converting a High School into an Agro-Industrial High School: Bersamin Agro-Industrial High School
1998-02-13	8520	Converting a High School Annex into an Independent National High School: PNS-Panitian National High School
1998-02-13	8521	Converting a High School Annex into an Independent National High School: Teodoro Dela Vega National High School
1998-02-14	8522	Appropriations Act of 1998
1998-02-14	8523	Amending EO 81 or the Revised Charter of the Development Bank of the Philippines
1998-02-14	8524	Amending RA 7160 or the Local Government Code of 1991: Prolonging the Term of office of Barangay Officials and Members of the Sangguniang Kabataan From Three Years to Five Years
1998-02-14	8525	Adopt-a-School Act of 1998
1998-02-14	8526	Converting a Municipality into a Highly Urbanized City
1998-02-14	8527	Increasing Bed Capacity of a Hospital: Dr. Paulino J. Garcia Memorial Research and Medical Center Extension Hospital
1998-02-14	8528	Amending RA 7720 or the Charter of the City of Santiago
1998-02-14	8529	Radio and Television Broadcasting Franchise: Mindanao Broadcasting and News Network, Inc.(MBNN)
1998-02-14	8530	Establishing a District Engineering Office
1998-02-20	8531	Local Exchange Network Franchise: Ipil Telephone Company, Inc
1998-02-23	8532	Amending the Comprehensive Agrarian Reform Act of 1998 or RA 6657: Strengthening Further the Program by Providing an Augmentation Fund
1998-02-23	8533	Amending the Family Code of the Philippines or EO 209: Nullifying the Prescriptive Periof for Action or Defenses Grounded on Psychological Incapacity
1998-02-23	8534	Philippine Interior Design Act of 1998
1998-02-23	8535	Creating a City: Novaliches City
1998-02-23	8536	Creating a Hospital: Far North Luzon General Hospital and Training Center
1998-02-23	8537	Establishing a National High School: Bonliw National High School
1998-02-23	8538	Establishing a National High School
1998-02-23	8539	Establishing a National High School: San Isidro National High School
1998-02-23	8540	Establishing a National High School: San Jose National High School
1998-02-23	8541	Establishing a National High School: Lemery National High School
1998-02-23	8542	Establishing a National High School: Ajuy National High School
1998-02-23	8543	Upgrading a Hospital to Tertiary Level: Basilan Provincial Hospital
1998-02-24	8544	Philippine Merchant Marine Officers Act of 1998
1998-02-24	8545	Amending RA 6728 or the Government Assistance to Students and Teachers in Private Education Act: Providing for Salary Subsidies for Private Teachers and other Provisions
1998-02-24	8546	Declaring a National Shrine: Biak-na-Bato Site
1998-02-24	8547	Converting a college into a State College: Ilocos Sur Polytechnic State College
1998-02-24	8548	Converting a School into a State College: Bulacan National Agricultural State College (BNASC)
1998-02-24	8549	Upgrading a Hospital to Tertiary Level: Ospital ng Palawan (Formerly, Puerto Princesa Provincial Hospital)
1998-02-25	8550	The Philippine Fisheries Code of 1998
1998-02-25	8551	Amending RA 6975: Philippine National Police Reform and Reorganization Act of 1998
1998-02-25	8552	Domestic Adoption Act of 1998
1998-02-25	8553	Amending RA 7160 or the Local Government Code of 1991: On the Composition of the Sangguniangs Panlalawigan, Panlungsod, and Bayan
1998-02-25	8554	Converting a School into a college: Carigara College of Fisheries
1998-02-26	8555	Amending RA 8182 or the Official Development Assistance Act of 1996
1998-02-26	8556	Amending RA 5980 or the Financing Company Act: Financing Company Act of 1998
1998-02-26	8557	Establishing the Philippine Judicial Academy (PHILJA)
1998-02-26	8558	Amending PD 442 or the Labor Code of the Philippines: Reducing the Retirement Age of Underground Mine Workers from Sixty to Fifty
1998-02-26	8559	Philippine Agricultural Engineering Act of 1998: Repealing RA 3927
1998-02-26	8560	Philippine Geodetic Engineering Act of 1998: Repealing RA 4374 or the Geodetic Engineering Act
1998-02-26	8561	Upgrading a Hospital to Tertiary Level: Bataan Provincial Hospital
1998-02-26	8562	Integrating Colleges into a State College: Bataan Polytechnic State College
1998-02-26	8563	Converting a college into a State College: Apayao State College
1998-02-27	8564	Local Exchange Network Franchise: Lukban Telephone System, Inc.
1998-02-27	8565	Local Exchange Network Franchise: Northern Telephone Company, Inc.
1998-02-27	8566	Local Exchange Network Franchise: Labo Telephone System, Inc.
1998-02-27	8567	Establishing a National High School: Binakayan National High School
1998-02-27	8568	Establishing a National High School: Sara National High School
1998-02-27	8569	Establishing a National High School: Jacinto C. Borja National High School
1998-02-27	8570	Establishing a National High School
1998-02-27	8571	Establishing a National High School: Tambongan National High School
1998-02-27	8572	Converting a High School Annex into an Independent National High School: Pigcawaran National High School
1998-02-27	8573	Establishing a National High School: Mabatang National High School
1998-02-27	8574	Establishing a National High School: Mat-i National High School
1998-02-27	8575	Establishing a National High School: Tulang National High School
1998-02-28	8576	Local Exchange Network Franchise: Romblon Telephone Corporation
1998-02-28	8577	Local Exchange Network Franchise: Southern Iloilo Telephone Company, Inc.
1998-02-28	8578	Radio and Television Broadcasting Franchise: Ever Broadcasting Network, Inc.
1998-02-28	8579	Local Exchange Network Franchise: Continental Telecommunications System, Inc.
1998-02-28	8580	Establishing a National High School: Tataya National High School
1998-02-28	8581	Establishing a National High School: Vicente V. Andaya Sr. National High School
1998-02-28	8582	Converting a School into a college: Occidental Mindoro Polytechnic College
1998-02-28	8583	Air Transport Franchise for Domestic and International Service: Grand International Airways, Inc (Grand Air)
1998-03-02	8584	Converting a High School into an Agricultural High School: Pilar National Agricultural High School
1998-03-02	8585	Converting a High School Annex into an Independent National High School: Pitalo National High School
1998-03-02	8586	Converting a High School Annex into an Independent National High School: Tulay National High School
1998-03-02	8587	Converting a High School Annex into an Independent National High School: Valencia National Vocational High School
1998-03-02	8588	Converting a High School Annex into an Independent National High School: Lipata Central I National High School
1998-03-05	8589	Local Exchange Network Franchise: Samartel, Inc.
1998-03-12	8590	Local Exchange Network Franchise: Calbayog Telephone System
1998-03-12	8591	Amending RA 8169: Granting a Television Broadcasting Franchise to GV Broadcasting System, Inc. and Expanding its Franchise Nationwide
1998-03-12	8592	Establishing a National High School: New Busuanga National High School
1998-03-12	8593	Converting a Municipality into a Component City
1998-03-14	8594	Converting a School into a college: Governor Mariano Fuentebella Memorial College of Fisheries
1998-03-14	8595	Establishing a National High School: Anabo National High School
1998-03-18	8596	Converting a college into a Polytechnic College: New Lucena Polytechnic College
1998-03-20	8597	Local Exchange Network Franchise: Trento Telephone System, Incorporated
1998-03-20	8598	Establishing a National High School: Balungao National High School
1998-03-20	8599	Converting a Regional Hospital into a Medical Center: Cagayan Valley Medical Center
1998-03-21	8600	Converting a High School Annex into an Independent National High School: Bulata National High School
1998-03-21	8601	Converting a High School Annex into an Independent National High School: Manalad National High School
1998-03-21	8602	Converting a High School Annex into an Independent National High School: Cauayan National High School
1998-03-26	8603	Radio and Television Broadcasting Franchise: Exodus Broadcasting Co., Inc.
1998-03-26	8604	Radio and Television Broadcasting Franchise: Probe Productions, Inc.
1998-03-26	8605	Cable/Community Antenna Television and Direct to User Satellite Systems Franchise: Atlocom Wireless System, Inc.
1998-03-26	8606	Local Exchange Network Franchise: Radio City Telephone Company, Inc. (RACITELCO)
1998-03-27	8607	Radio and Television Broadcasting Franchise: Altimax Broadcasting Co., Inc.
1998-03-27	8608	Radio and Television Broadcasting Franchise: Rainbow Global Media Arts Network, Inc. (RGMA Network, Inc.)
1998-03-27	8609	Cable/Community Antenna Television and Direct to User Satellite Systems Franchise: Kabasalan Satellite Cable Television System, Inc.
1998-03-27	8610	Local Exchange Network Franchise: Western Batangas Telephone System, Inc.
1998-03-27	8611	Cable/Community Antenna Television and Direct to User Satellite Systems Franchise: Digital Entertainment Corporation
1998-03-27	8612	Converting a college into a State University: Nueva Ecija University of Science and Technology
1998-03-27	8613	Converting a High School into a National High School: Apurawan National High School
1998-03-27	8614	Converting a High School Annex into an Independent National High School: Salogon National High School
1998-04-02	8615	Local Exchange Network Franchise: Independent Telephone Company, Inc.
1998-04-02	8616	Converting a High School into a National High School: Culandanum National High School
1998-04-02	8617	Converting a High School Annex into an Independent National High School: Tagusao National High School
1998-04-02	8618	Converting a High School Annex into an Independent National High School: Panacan National High School
1998-04-02	8619	Amending RA 8304: Additional Provisions on the Transition of San Rafael National High School into Philippine Science High School-Camarines Sur Campus
1998-04-04	8620	Cable/Community Antenna Television and Direct to User Satellite Systems Franchise: Direct Broadcast Satellite Phil., Inc.
1998-04-05	8621	Radio and Television Broadcasting Franchise: All Asia Broadcast Systems, Inc.
1998-04-08	8622	Telecommunications Franchise: Hi-Frequency Telecommunications Inc.
1998-04-08	8623	Radio and Television Broadcasting Franchise: Nation Broadcasting Corporation
1998-04-09	8624	Establishing a Trade School: San Agustin National Trade School
1998-04-12	8625	Converting a High School Annex into an Independent National High School: Canasujan National High School
1998-04-15	8626	Designating the Bayanihan Philippine Dance Company as the Philippine National Folk Dance Company
1998-04-19	8627	Telecommunications Franchise: Mindanao Islamic Telephone Company, Inc.
1998-04-23	8628	Converting a college into a State College: Surigao Del Sur Polytechnic State College (SSPSC)
1998-04-30	8629	Granting Citizenship to a Person
1998-05-07	8630	Radio and Television Broadcasting Franchise: Philippine Multi-Media System, Inc.
1998-05-07	8631	Establishing a National High School: Dumalinao National High School
1998-05-07	8632	Establishing a National High School: Maestro Cornelio Minor National High School
1998-05-07	8633	Establishing a National High School: San Pablo National High School
1998-05-07	8634	Increasing Bed Capacity of a Hospital: Baguio General Hospital and Medical Center
1998-05-14	8635	Local Exchange Network Franchise: RMC Telecommunications Consultants, Inc.
1998-05-17	8636	Local Exchange Network Franchise: General Telephone System, Inc.
1998-05-17	8637	Local Exchange Network Franchise: Sultan Kudarat Telephone System, Inc.
1998-05-17	8638	Converting a High School Annex into an Independent National High School: Rep. Maximino Noel (Guadalupe) National High School
1998-05-17	8639	Converting a High School Annex into an Independent National High School: Lawa-an (Talisay) National High School
1998-05-17	8640	Converting a High School Annex into an Independent National High School: Uling National High School
1998-05-17	8641	Converting a High School Annex into an Independent National High School: Tungkop National High School
1998-05-27	8642	Establishing a High School
1998-05-30	8643	Radio Broadcasting Franchise: Globe Email Philippines, Inc.
1998-05-30	8644	Establishing a National High School: Kalayaan National High School
1998-05-30	8645	Establishing a High School: Logac High School
1998-05-30	8646	Establishing a National High School: Natonin National High School
1998-05-30	8647	Establishing a National High School: Maras National High School
1998-05-30	8648	Converting a High School Annex into an Independent National High School: New Pualas National High School
1998-05-30	8649	Converting a High School Annex into an Independent National High School: Lantapan National High School
1998-06-05	8650	Integrating Schools into a State College: Surigao State College of Technology
1998-06-10	8651	Converting a college into a State College: Adiong Memorial Polytechnic State College
1998-06-14	8652	Radio Paging Franchise: Skytel Philippines, Inc.
1998-06-14	8653	Local Exchange Network Franchise: Plaridel Service Cooperative
1998-06-14	8654	Local Exchange Network Franchise: Mindoro Telecommunications Corporation
1998-06-14	8655	Converting a School into a State College: Samar State College of Agriculture and Forestry
1998-06-14	8656	Establishing a National High School: Hondagua National High School
1998-06-22	8657	Telecommunications Franchise: Transpacific Broadcast Group International, Inc.
1998-06-22	8658	Increasing Bed Capacity of a Hospital: Vicente Sotto Memorial Medical Center
1998-06-22	8659	Integrating Colleges into a State College: Central Visayas State College of Agriculture, Forestry, and Technology
1998-06-25	8660	Establishing a High School: Papaya High School
1998-06-25	8661	Establishing a High School: Jaybanga High School
1998-06-25	8662	Establishing a National High School: Las Salinas National High School
1998-06-25	8663	Establishing a National High School: Kauswagan National High School
1998-06-25	8664	Establishing a National High School: Lampanusan National High School
1998-06-25	8665	Establishing a National High School: Nanan National High School
1998-06-25	8666	Converting a High School into an Agro-Industrial High School: Don Benito Agro-Industrial High School
1998-06-25	8667	Converting a High School into a National High School: Salvacion National High School
1998-06-25	8668	Converting a High School into an Agro-Industrial High School: Mansilingan Agro-Industrial High School
1998-06-25	8669	Converting a High School Department of a college into an Independent National High School: Sibaltan National High School
1998-06-25	8670	Establishing a National High School: Francisco G. Perez Memorial National High School
1998-06-25	8671	Converting a High School into an Agro-Industrial High School: Cabilaoan Agro-Industrial High School
1998-06-25	8672	Converting a High School into an Agro-Industrial High School: Amamperez Agro-Industrial High School
1998-06-25	8673	Converting a High School into a National High School: Pinili National High School
1998-06-25	8674	Local Exchange Network Franchise: Bongao Nationwide Telephone System, Incorporated
1998-06-25	8675	Local Exchange Network Franchise: Mati Telephone Corporation
1998-06-25	8676	Local Exchange Network Franchise: Western Misamis Oriental Telephone Cooperative, Inc. (WEMORTELCO)
1998-06-25	8677	Telecommunications Franchise: Radio Communications of the Philippines, Inc.
1998-06-25	8678	Telecommunications Franchise: Sear Telecommunications, Inc.
1998-06-25	8679	Radio and Television Broadcasting Franchise: Cordova News Network, Inc.
1998-06-25	8680	Radio and Television Broadcasting Franchise: Multipoint Broadcasting Network, Incorporated
1998-06-25	8681	Radio Broadcasting Franchise: Sultan Kudarat Islamic Academy Foundation, Inc.
1998-06-25	8682	Radio and Television Broadcasting Franchise: VTV Corporation
1998-06-25	8683	Radio and Television Broadcasting Franchise: Quirino Broadcasting Corporation
1998-06-25	8684	Radio and Television Broadcasting Franchise: VOM Broadcasting Corporation
1998-06-25	8685	Radio and Television Broadcasting Franchise: PEC Broadcasting Corporation
1998-06-25	8686	Radio Broadcasting Franchise: Mountain View College of Sevent Day Adventists
1998-06-25	8687	Radio and Television Broadcasting Franchise: Westwind Broadcasting Corporation
1998-06-27	8688	Converting a State College into a State University: Cebu Normal University
1998-07-02	8689	Radio and Television Broadcasting Franchise: Digital Broadcasting Corporation
1998-07-02	8690	Local Exchange Network Franchise: Santos Telephone Corporation, Inc.
1998-07-04	8691	Radio and Television Broadcasting Franchise: Masawa Broadcasting Corporation
1998-07-04	8692	Radio Broadcasting Franchise: Zambales Broadcasting and Development Corporation
1998-07-09	8693	Establishment of a Hospital: Don Emilio del Valle Memorial Hospital
1998-07-09	8694	Renaming an Educational Institution: Southern Samar College of Agriculture, Science, and Technology
1998-07-09	8695	Converting a National High School into a National High School: Rosalio Eduarte National High School
1998-07-09	8696	Establishing a National High School: Barangay Cansilayan National High School
1998-07-09	8697	Converting a High School Annex into an Independent High School: San Guillermo National High School
1998-07-09	8698	Converting a High School into a National Science and Technology High School: Misamis Occidental Science High School
1998-07-09	8699	Amending the Radio and Television Broadcasting Franchise of the First United Broadcasting Corporation (FUBC): Radio, television, and Satellite Broadcasting Franchise
1998-07-09	8700	Amending RA 7296: Granting Air Transport Franchise to Davao Agritech, Inc.
1998-07-09	8701	Radio and Television Broadcasting Franchise: Image Broadcasting Corp.
1998-07-09	8702	Radio Broadcasting Franchise: Tamaraw Broadcasting Corporation
1998-07-09	8703	Radio Broadcasting Franchise: Avila Broadcasting Network, Incorporated
1998-07-09	8704	Local Exchange Network Franchise: Panay Telephone Corporation
1998-07-09	8705	Cable/Community Antenna Television System Franchise: Maasin Cable Television
1998-07-10	8706	Converting a High School into a college: Canuto M.S. Enerio College of Arts and Trade
1998-07-16	8707	Establishing a National High School: Kibawe National High School
1998-07-16	8708	Establishing a National High School: Dimiao National High School
1998-07-16	8709	Establishing a National High School: Mabini National High School
1998-07-16	8710	Establishing a National High School: Sigay National High School
1998-07-16	8711	Converting a High School Annex into an Independent High School: Salvacion National High School
1998-07-16	8712	Establishing a National High School: Dangcagan National High School
1998-07-16	8713	Establishing a School of Arts and Trades: Buyabod School of Arts and Trades
1998-07-16	8714	Renaming a Road: Congressman Felimon C. Aguilar Avenue
1998-07-16	8715	Local Exchange Network Franchise: Tandag Electric and Telephone Company, Inc.
1998-07-16	8716	Local Exchange Network Franchise: North Camarines Telephone Co., Inc.
1998-07-16	8717	Radio and Television Broadcasting Franchise: E.M. Orosco & Sons, Inc.
1998-07-16	8718	Radio and Television Broadcasting Franchise: Baycomms Broadcasting Corporation
1998-07-16	8719	Local Exchange Network Franchise: TRGV-JAFGO Corporation
1998-07-16	8720	Local Exchange Network Franchise: Eastern Misamis Oriental Telephone Cooperative (EMORTELCO)
1998-07-16	8721	Local Exchange Network Franchise: Multi-Line Construction International, Inc.
1998-07-23	8722	Converting a High School Annex into an Independent National High School: Malinta National High School
1998-07-23	8723	Converting a High School Annex into an Independent National High School: Lawang Bato National High School
1998-07-26	8724	Establishing a National Science High School: Rizal National Science High School
1998-07-26	8725	Establishing a National High School: Manggitahan National High School
1998-08-03	8726	Radio and Television Broadcasting Franchise: Blockbuster Broadcasting System, Inc.
1998-08-06	8727	Radio and Television Broadcasting Franchise: Elfren B. Servando Jr. (EBS) Broadcasting Network
1998-08-06	8728	Converting a School into a college: Judge Guillermo Eleazar Polytechnic College
1998-08-21	8729	Local Exchange Network Franchise: Princess Urduja Communications, Inc.
1998-08-29	8730	Converting a High School Annex into an Independent High School: Tabunoc National High School
1998-08-29	8731	Converting a High School Annex into an Independent High School: Mohon (Divino Amore) National High School
1998-08-29	8732	Converting a High School Annex into an Independent High School: Ocana National High School
1998-08-29	8733	Converting a High School Annex into an Independent High School: Carcar Central I National High School
1998-09-03	8734	Converting a High School Annex into an Independent High School: Pasil National High School
1998-09-03	8735	Radio and Television Broadcasting Franchise: Kumintang Broadcasting System
1998-09-03	8736	Radio Broadcasting Franchise: Franciscan Broadcasting Corporation
1998-09-17	8737	Radio and Television Broadcasting Franchise: V.G. Sinco Educational Corporation (Foundation University)
1998-09-17	8738	Converting a High School Annex into an Independent High School: Mangyan National High School
1998-09-17	8739	Converting a High School Annex into an Independent High School: Julian Enad National High School
1998-09-18	8740	Radio and Television Broadcasting Franchise: Cagayan de Oro College, Inc.
1998-09-25	8741	Establishing a School of Arts and Trades: Torrijos Poblacion School of Arts and Trades
1998-10-02	8742	Radio and Television Broadcasting Franchise: Premiere Mass Media, Inc.
1998-11-07	8743	Radio and Television Broadcasting Franchise: Neutron Broadcast Network, Inc.
1998-12-10	8744	Amending RA 7901: Repealing the Transfer to Region XI of Sultan Kudarat
1998-12-30	8745	Appropriations Act of 1999

=== 1997 (8248–8445) ===
Date approved	RA number	Title/category
1997-01-29	8248	Amending RA 7687 or the Science and Technology Scholarship Act of 1994: Establishing the Science and Technology Human Resource Development Council and Increasing Appropriations for the Program through PAGCOR
1997-02-05	8249	Amending RA 1486 and 1606: Further Defining the Jurisdiction of the Sandiganbayan
1997-02-12	8250	Appropriations Act of 1997
1997-02-12	8251	Converting a Municipality into a Highly Urbanized City
1997-02-11	8252	Declaring Every July 6 a Special Nonworking Holiday in Mambajao Municipality in Commemoration of its Foundation
1997-02-11	8253	Declaring Every July 1 a Special Nonworking Holiday in Mahinog Municipality in Commemoration of its Foundation
1997-02-11	8254	Declaring Every July 8 a Special Nonworking Holiday in Guinsiliban Municipality in Commemoration of its Foundation
1997-02-11	8255	Converting a Hospital into a Regional Hospital: CARAGA Regional Hospital
1997-02-13	8256	Declaring the Foundation Days and Feast Days of Davao Oriental and its Municipalities into Special Nonworking Holidays
1997-02-13	8257	Converting a High School Annex into an Independent National High School: Mahatao National High School
1997-02-13	8258	Establishing a National High School: Lual National High School
1997-02-16	8259	Establishing a National High School: San Teodoro National High School
1997-02-16	8260	Establishing a National High School: Kongkong Valley National High School
1997-02-16	8261	Establishing a High School: Raniag High School
1997-02-16	8262	Establishing a Vocational High School: Sudipen Vocational High School
1997-02-16	8263	Converting a High School into a National High School: Kimanait National High School
1997-02-16	8264	Converting a High School into a National High School: Luzviminda National High School
1997-02-16	8265	Converting a High School Annex into an Independent National High School: Quezon Aramaywan National High School
1997-02-20	8266	Granting Citizenship to a Person
1997-02-20	8267	Declaring Every July 1 a Special Nonworking Holiday in Tagbilaran City in Commemoration of its Cityhood
1997-03-01	8268	Converting a High School into a National High School: Nava National High School
1997-03-01	8269	Converting a High School Annex into an Independent National High School: Antadao National High School
1997-03-01	8270	Converting a High School Annex into an Independent National High School: Dacudao National High School
1997-03-01	8271	Converting a High School Annex into an Independent National High School: Concepcion National High School
1997-03-03	8272	Changing the Name of an Elementary School: Tiburcia Carpio Malvar Elementary School
1997-03-03	8273	Converting a High School into a National High School: Las Piñas North National High School
1997-03-03	8274	Converting a High School into a National High School: Maningalao High School
1997-04-04	8275	Establishing a National High School: Governor Alfredo Abueg Sr. National Technology and Vocational Memorial High School
1997-04-05	8276	Cable/Community Antenna Television and Direct to User Satellite Systems Franchise: Pacific Cable and DTU Systems, Inc.
1997-04-10	8277	Establishing a National High School [NEED INFO]
1997-04-10	8278	Establishing a National High School: Maribuyong National High School
1997-04-10	8279	Telecommunications Franchise: Message Systems, Inc.
1997-04-10	8280	Telecommunications Franchise: New Century Telecoms, Inc.
1997-04-14	8281	Telecommunications Franchise: Pacific Wireless, Inc.
1997-05-01	8282	Amending RA 1161 or the Social Security Act: Social Security Act of 1997
1997-05-03	8283	Converting a High School Annex into an Independent National High School: Flora National High School
1997-05-03	8284	Converting a National High School into a National Comprehensive High School: Lopez National Comprehensive High School
1997-05-03	8285	Converting a High School into a National High School: Pagadian City National Comprehensive High School
1997-05-03	8286	Converting a High School into a National High School: Quinlogan National High School
1997-05-03	8287	Converting a National High School into a National Science High School: Puerto Princesa City National Science High School
1997-05-03	8288	Converting a High School into a National High School: Siocon National High School
1997-05-06	8289	Amending RA 6977 or the Magna Carta for Small Enterprises: Strengthening the Promotion Development and Assistance to SMEs
1997-05-23	8290	Converting a High School into a National High School: San Quintin National High School
1997-05-30	8291	Amending PD 1146 or the Revised Government Service Insurance Act of 1977: The Government Service Insurance System Act of 1997
1997-06-06	8292	Higher Education Modernization Act of 1997
1997-06-06	8293	Intellectual Property Code of the Philippines
1997-06-06	8294	Amending PD 1866: Provisions on the Unlawful Manufacture, Sale, Acquisition, Disposition, Possession, Repacking and Tampering/Alteration of Firearms, Ammunitions, Explosives, or Instruments Used in or Intended for their Manufacture
1997-06-06	8295	Provisions on the Proclamation of a Lone Candidate for Any Elective Office in a Special Election
1997-06-06	8296	Declaring every Second Sunday of December as the National Children's Broadcasting Day
1997-06-06	8297	Converting a Municipality into a Component City
1997-06-06	8298	Amending 7978 or the Horse Racing Franchise of the Metro Manila Turf Club, Inc: Expanding its Area of Operation and Modifying Franchise Taxes Imposed
1997-06-06	8299	Changing the Name of a National High School: Polillo National High School
1997-06-06	8300	Converting a High School into an Agricultural High School: Calapagan Agricultural Vocational High School
1997-06-06	8301	Converting a High School Annex into an Independent National High School: Capual National High School
1997-06-06	8302	Converting a High School into an Agricultural High School: Rebokon Agricultural and Vocational High School
1997-06-06	8303	Converting a High School into an Agricultural High School: Tacul Agricultural High School
1997-06-06	8304	Converting a High School into a Science High School: San Rafael National Science High School
1997-06-06	8305	Converting a High School Annex into an Independent National High School: Sulivan National High School
1997-06-06	8306	Converting a High School Annex into an Independent National High School: Rawis National High School
1997-06-06	8307	Converting a High School Annex into an Independent National High School: Guinlajon National High School
1997-06-13	8308	Establishing a National High School: Cuyapo National High School
1997-06-14	8309	Converting a High School Annex into an Independent National High School: Montol National High School
1997-06-14	8310	Converting a High School Annex into an Independent National High School: Florentino Galang Sr. National High School
1997-06-14	8311	Converting a High School Annex into an Independent National High School: Eva J. Montilla National High School
1997-06-20	8312	Converting a High School Annex into an Independent National High School: Pioduran National High School
1997-06-20	8313	Increasing Bed Capacity of a Hospital: Quiriono Memorial Medical Center with an Upgrade of Services, Facilities and Professional Health Care, and Increased Medical Personnel
1997-06-20	8314	Converting a Hospital as a Regional Hospital: Luis Hora Memorial Hospital
1997-06-30	8315	Declaring Every December 8 a Special Nonworking Holiday in Angeles City in Commemoration of its Foundation
1997-06-30	8316	Converting a Regional Hospital into a Medical Center: Cotabato Regional and Medical Center
1997-06-30	8317	Establishing a Vocational School: Lubao Vocational School
1997-06-30	8318	Establishing a National High School: Caganayan National High School
1997-06-30	8319	Establishing a National High School: San Agustin National High School
1997-06-30	8320	Establishing a National High School: Cabalic National High School
1997-06-30	8321	Establishing a National High School: Polopina National High School
1997-06-30	8322	Establishing a National High School: Macangao Agricultural Vocational High School
1997-06-30	8323	Establishing a National High School: Sanchez Mira National High School
1997-06-30	8324	Establishing a National High School: Buenavista National High School
1997-06-30	8325	Establishing a National High School: Talakag National High School
1997-06-30	8326	Establishing a National High School: Sigaboy Agricultural Vocational High School
1997-06-30	8327	Establishing a National High School: Mapandan National High School
1997-06-30	8328	Establishing a National High School: Bacan National High School
1997-06-30	8329	Establishing a National High School: Tagugpo National High School
1997-06-30	8330	Establishing a National High School: Alitagtag National High School
1997-06-30	8331	Establishing a National High School: Bambang National High School
1997-06-30	8332	Amending RA 7908 or the Radio Paging Franchise of Multi-Media Telephony Incorporated: Converting Franchise Granted into a Telecommunications Franchise
1997-07-05	8333	Establishing a Vocational High School: Alicia Vocational School
1997-07-10	8334	Local Exchange Network Franchise: Eastern Visayas Telephone Company, Inc.
1997-07-11	8335	Amending RA 3279 or the Revised Charter of the City of Calbayog: On the Constitution and Organization of its Sangguniang Panlungsod
1997-07-14	8336	Radio and Television Broadcasting Franchise: Real Time Communications, Inc.
1997-07-14	8337	Telecommunications Franchise: Meridian Telekoms, Inc.
1997-08-08	8338	Upgrading a Hospital to Tertiary Level: Southern Isabela General Hospital
1997-08-08	8339	Air Transport Franchise for Domestic and international Service: Air Philippines Corporation
1997-08-08	8340	Local Exchange Network Franchise: Victorias Telephone System, Inc.`
1997-08-08	8341	Local Exchange Network Franchise: San Carlos Telephone Company, Inc.
1997-08-08	8342	Local Exchange Network Franchise: Bicol Telephone and Telegraph, Inc.
1997-08-12	8343	Upgrading a Hospital to Tertiary Level: Adela Serra Ty Memorial Medical Center
1997-08-25	8344	Amending Batas Pambansa 702: Penalizing Refusal of Hospital and Medical Clinics to Administer Treatment and Support in Emergency or Serious Cases
1997-08-25	8345	Increasing Bed Capacity of a Hospital: East Avenue Medical Center with an Upgrade of Services, Facilities and Professional Health Care, and Increased Medical Personnel
1997-08-29	8346	Radio Paging Franchise: Kloche Communications, Inc.
1997-09-05	8347	Radio and Television Broadcasting Franchise: Oracle Network, Inc.
1997-09-05	8348	Local Exchange Network Franchise: RC Yulo Telephone System, Inc.
1997-09-05	8349	Local Exchange Network Franchise: Naga Telephone Company, Inc.
1997-09-05	8350	Local Exchange Network Franchise: Telecommunications Management and Services, Inc.
1997-09-05	8351	Local Exchange Network Franchise: Calapan Telephone System, Inc
1997-09-13	8352	Local Exchange Network Franchise: Butuan City Telephone Co., Inc.
1997-09-30	8353	Amending the Revised Penal Code or Act 3815: The Anti-Rape Act of 1997
1997-10-09	8354	Establishing a National High School: Lipit National High School
1997-10-09	8355	Establishing a National High School: Magsingal National High School
1997-10-09	8356	Establishing a National High School: New Caridad National Vocational and Technological High School
1997-10-09	8357	Establishing a National High School: Arayat National High School
1997-10-09	8358	Establishing a National High School: Lanao-Kuran National Vocational and Technological High School
1997-10-09	8359	Establishing a National High School: Cabugao National High School
1997-10-09	8360	Establishing a National High School: Talingting National High School
1997-10-09	8361	Establishing a National High School: Dumalogdog National High School
1997-10-09	8362	Establishing a National High School: Bayawan National High School
1997-10-09	8363	Changing the Name of a National High School: Cabugao National High School
1997-10-09	8364	Amending RA 7622: Transferring Administrative Supervision of a Science High School from DECS to DOST
1997-10-11	8365	Converting a State College into a State University: Rizal Technological University
1997-10-21	8366	Amending PD 129 or the Investment Houses Act: Liberalizing the Philippine Investment House Industry
1997-10-21	8367	Revised Non-Stock Savings and Loan Association Act of 1997
1997-10-27	8368	Anti-Squatting Law Repeal Act of 1997: Repealing PD 772 Penalizing Squatting and Similar Acts
1997-10-28	8369	Amending BP 129 or the Judiciary Reorganization Act of 1980: Family Courts Act of 1997
1997-10-28	8370	Children's Television Act of 1997
1997-10-29	8371	The Indigenous Peoples Rights Act of 1997
1997-11-02	8372	Upgrading a Hospital to Tertiary Level: Don Jose S. Monfort Medical Center Extension Hospital
1997-11-06	8373	Establishing a National High School: San Enrique National Comprehensive High School
1997-11-13	8374	Establishing a National High School: Claveria National High School
1997-11-13	8375	Establishing a National High School: Punta Buri National High School
1997-11-13	8376	Establishing a Science High School: Cordillera Regional Science High School
1997-11-13	8377	Establishing a National High School: Tubod National High School
1997-11-13	8378	Establishing a National High School: Pacita Complex National High School
1997-11-13	8379	Converting a High School into an Arts and Trade School: Ormoc City School of Arts and Trade
1997-11-13	8380	Converting a High School Annex into an Independent National High School: Irisan National High School
1997-11-13	8381	Converting a High School into a National High School: Dungawan National High School
1997-11-13	8382	Converting a High School Annex into an Independent National High School: Kadaclan National High School
1997-11-13	8383	Converting a High School Annex into an Independent National High School: Tugatog National High School
1997-11-22	8384	Converting a High School Annex into an Independent National High School: Pio Da Lim Memorial School of Arts and Trade
1997-11-22	8385	Converting a High School Annex into an Independent National High School: Julio Ledesma National High School
1997-11-22	8386	Converting a High School Annex into an Independent National High School: Buda National High School
1997-11-22	8387	Converting a High School Annex into an Independent National High School: Panabungen School of Arts, Trade and Home Industries
1997-11-22	8388	Converting a High School Annex into an Independent National High School: Crossing Bayabas National High School
1997-11-22	8389	Establishing a National High School: Kalayaan National High School
1997-11-22	8390	Establishing a National High School: Crispina Marcos-Valdez National High School
1997-11-22	8391	Converting a High School Annex into an Independent National High School: Canumay National High School
1997-11-22	8392	Establishing a Vocational High School: Don Julio Leviste Memorial Vocational High School
1997-11-22	8393	Establishing a High School: Pili High School
1997-11-22	8394	Establishing a National High School: Malasila National Vocational and Technological High School
1997-11-22	8395	Establishing a National High School: Tay-ac National High School
1997-11-22	8396	Establishing a National High School: Jimalalud National High School
1997-11-22	8397	Establishing a National Agro-Industrial High School: Santa Maria Agro-Industrial High School
1997-11-22	8398	Establishing a National High School: Napalico National Vocational and Technological High School
1997-11-22	8399	Establishing a National High School: Burgos National High School
1997-11-22	8400	Converting a High School into a National High School: Guiuan National High School
1997-11-22	8401	Converting a High School into a National High School: Rizal National School of Arts and Trades
1997-11-22	8402	Converting a High School into a National High School: Marsman National High School
1997-11-22	8403	Converting a High School into a National High School: Hilaan National High School
1997-11-22	8404	Converting an Elementary School into a Science Elementary School: Cabagan Science Elementary School
1997-11-22	8405	Converting a High School into a National High School: Santa Fe National High School
1997-11-22	8406	Converting a High School into a National High School: Pulonggubat National High School
1997-11-23	8407	Horse Racing Franchise Renewal: Manila Jockey Club, Inc.
1997-11-23	8408	Radio and Television Broadcasting Franchise: Wave Network, Inc.
1997-11-27	8409	Declaring Every August 30 as a Special Nonworking Holiday in Sinacaban Municipality
1997-11-27	8410	Declaring Every October 20 as a Special Nonworking Holiday in Ormoc City
1997-11-27	8411	Converting a Hospital into a Medical Center: Ilocos Training and Regional Medical Center
1997-11-27	8412	Converting a Hospital into a Regional Hospital: Margosatubig Regional Hospital
1997-11-27	8413	Converting a High School Annex into an Independent National High School: Sampaguita National High School
1997-11-27	8414	Converting a High School Annex into an Independent National High School: Conner Central National High School
1997-11-27	8415	Establishing a National High School: Taguibo Agricultural Vocational High School
1997-11-27	8416	Converting a High School Department of a college into an Independent National High School: Villaba National Comprehensive High School
1997-11-27	8417	Establishing a Fishery School: Lagonoy Fishery School
1997-11-27	8418	Establishing a National High School: Eastern Cabu National High School
1997-11-27	8419	Establishing a National High School: Orani National High School
1997-11-27	8420	Establishing a National High School: Natividad National High School
1997-11-27	8421	Converting a High School Annex into an Independent National High School: Abaroan National High School
1997-11-27	8422	Converting a High School into a National High School: Marcelina National High School
1997-12-09	8423	Traditional and Alternative Medicine Act (TAMA) of 1997
1997-12-11	8424	Tax Reform Act of 1997 or the National Internal Revenue Code of 1997
1997-12-11	8425	Social Reform and Poverty Alleviation Act
1997-12-15	8426	Converting a High School Annex into an Independent National High School: Dr. Quintin Balcita Sr. National High School
1997-12-15	8427	Establishing a National High School: Kitcharao National High School
1997-12-15	8428	Establishing a National High School: Capacujan National High School
1997-12-15	8429	Establishing a National High School: Sagnap National High School
1997-12-15	8430	Establishing a National High School: Munai National High School
1997-12-15	8431	Establishing a National High School: Cawayan National High School
1997-12-15	8432	Establishing a National High School: Pototan National Comprehensive High School
1997-12-15	8433	Establishing a National High School: Janiuay National Comprehensive High School
1997-12-15	8434	Declaring Every March 10 a Special Nonworking Holiday in Siocon Municipality in Commemoration of its Foundation
1997-12-22	8435	Agriculture and Fisheries Modernization Act of 1997
1997-12-22	8436	Automated Election Act
1997-12-22	8437	Amending BP 877: Extending the Rent Control Period for Certain Residential Units
1997-12-22	8438	Establishing the Cordillera Autonomous Region [Rejected via Plebiscite]
1997-12-22	8439	Magna Carta for Scientists, Engineers, Researchers, and other S&T Personnel in the Government
1997-12-22	8440	Establishing the Military Service Board for the Confirmation of Claims of World War II Military Service
1997-12-22	8441	Amending RA 6686: Increasing the Annual Christmas Bonus to Government Officials and Employees:
1997-12-26	8442	Establishing a National High School: Eastern Bacoor National High School
1997-12-26	8443	Establishing a National High School: San Roque National High School
1997-12-29	8444	Establishing a High School: Lonoy Barangay High School
1997-12-29	8445	Establishing a National High School: Sampaloc National High School

=== 1996 (8177–8247) ===
Date approved	RA number	Title/category
1996-03-20	8177	Amending the Revised Penal Code or Act 3815 : Designation Death by Lethal Injection as the Method of Carrying Out Capital Punishment
1996-03-28	8178	Agricultural Tariffication Act
1996-03-28	8179	Amending RA 7042 or the Foreign Investments Act of 1991 : Further Liberalizing Foreign Investments
1996-03-28	8180	Downstream Oil Industry Deregulation Act of 1996
1996-03-28	8181	Amending PD 1464 or the Tariff and Customs Code of the Philippines : Changing the Basis of Dutiable Value of Imported Articles Subject to an Ad Valorem Rate of Duty from Home Consumption Value to Transaction Value
1996-06-11	8182	The Official Development Assistance Act of 1996
1996-06-11	8183	Allowing the Use of Other Currency Other Than the Legal Tender in the Settlement of Obligations or Transactions : Repealing RA 529
1996-06-11	8184	Amending the National Internal Revenue Code : Restructuring the Excise Tax on Petroleum Products
1996-06-11	8185	Amending RA 7160 or the Local Government Code of 1991 : On the Budgetary Requirements for Occurrence of Calamities
1996-06-11	8186	Prescribing the Grade Distribution and Tenure of Officers in the Active Force of the Armed Forces of the Philippines
1996-06-11	8187	Paternity Leave Act of 1996
1996-06-11	8188	Amending RA 6727 or the Wage Rationalization Act : Increasing the Penalty and Imposing Double Indemnity for the Violation of Prescribed Increases or Adjustments in the Wage Rates
1996-06-11	8189	The Voter's Registration Act of 1996
1996-06-11	8190	Prioritizing Local Residents for Appointment or Assignment as Teachers of Local Elementary and Secondary Schools
1996-06-11	8191	National Diabetes Act of 1996
1996-06-11	8192	Converting a Municipality into a Component City
1996-06-11	8193	Integrating Schools into a State College : Jose Rizal Memorial State College
1996-06-11	8194	Establishing a District Engineering Office
1996-06-15	8195	Cable/Community Antenna Television System Franchise : Destiny Cable, Inc.
1996-07-07	8196	Radio Broadcasting Franchise : Ermita Electronics, Incorporated
1996-07-11	8197	Cable/Community Antenna Television System Franchise : News and Entertainment Network Corporation
1996-07-11	8198	Telecommunications Franchise : Unicorn Communications Corporation
1996-07-11	8199	Taxi Communication Franchise : Taxinet, Inc
1996-07-30	8200	Upgrading a Hospital to Tertiary Level : Dr. Jose Rizal Memorial Hospital
1996-06-22	8201	Reconstituting District Engineering Offices into Four District Offices
1996-08-30	8202	Radio and Television Broadcasting Franchise : Romeo Cabrestante Servando
1996-09-04	8203	Special Law on Counterfeit Drugs
	8204	[NEED INFO]
1996-09-05	8205	Changing the Name of a Fisheries School : Jolo School of Fisheries
1996-09-05	8206	Changing the Name of a National High School : Alberto Olarte Sr. National High School
1996-09-05	8207	Changing the Name of a National High School : Jose de Arce Memorial High School
1996-09-05	8208	Changing the Name of an Elementary School : Antonio V. Apostol Sr. Memorial Elementary School
1996-09-05	8209	Radio and Television Broadcasting Franchise : Soundstream Broadcasting Corporation
1996-09-05	8210	Radio and Television Broadcasting Franchise : Interactive Broadcast Media, Inc.
1996-09-05	8211	Radio and Television Broadcasting Franchise : Horizon Broadcasting Company, Inc.
1996-09-05	8212	Radio and Television Broadcasting Franchise : Asia Pacific Business and Industrial Systems, Inc.
1996-09-05	8213	Radio and Television Broadcasting Franchise : GHT Network, Inc.
1996-09-07	8214	Radio and Television Broadcasting Franchise : Amado L. Ola
1996-09-07	8215	Cable/Community Antenna Television Franchise : Joy Cable System
1996-09-12	8216	Radio and Television Broadcasting Franchise : Oro Broadcasting Network, Inc.
1996-09-12	8217	Radio and Television Broadcasting Franchise: Celebes Sea Broadcasting Corporation
1996-09-12	8218	Radio Broadcasting Franchise : Capricom Production and Management
1996-09-12	8219	Radio and Television Broadcasting Franchise: RadioWorld Broadcasting Corporation
1996-10-09	8220	Creating a New Enlisted Rank in the Armed Forces of the Philippines (AFP) : Chief Master Sergeant/Master Chief Petty Officer and Senior Master Sergeant/Senior Chief Petty Officer
1996-10-09	8221	Declaring a National Shrine : Capas National Shrine
1996-10-24	8222	Radio and Television Franchise: Dioces of Laoag
1996-11-06	8223	Converting a Municipality into a Highly Urbanized City
1996-11-06	8224	Renaming a Road : President Garcia Avenue (Circumferential Route No. 5 or C-5)
1996-11-10	8225	Changing the name of a High School : Edna Guillermo Memorial High School
1996-11-10	8226	Establishing a National High School :Barangay La Filipina National High School
1996-11-10	8227	Changing the Name of an Elementary School : Aniceto Barbarona Elementary School
1996-11-10	8228	Converting a High School Annex into an Independent National High School : Binugao National High School
1996-11-10	8229	Changing the Name of an Elementary School : Juanito Doromal Sr. Elementary School
1996-11-10	8230	Changing the Name of an Elementary School : Pedro Bunot Central School
1996-11-10	8231	Establishing a National High School : Langiden National High School
1996-11-10	8232	Changing the name of a High School : Dr. Felipe De Jesus High School
1996-11-10	8233	Establishing a National High School : Maasin National Comprehensive High School
1996-11-10	8234	Converting a High School into a National High School : Macario Molina National High School
1996-11-10	8235	Establishing a National High School: Macabaclay High School
1996-11-10	8236	Converting a High School Annex into an Independent National High School : Sandoval National High School
1996-11-15	8237	Establishing a National High School: Barangay Alegria National High School
1996-11-15	8238	Converting a High School into a National High School : Mapawa National High School
1996-11-22	8239	Philippine Passport Act of 1996
1996-11-22	8240	Amending the National Internal Revenue Code of 1997 or RA 8424 : On Excise Tax on Distilled Spirits, Wines, Fermented Liquor, and Cigars and Cigarettes
1996-12-20	8241	Amending RA 7716 or the Expanded Value-Added Tax Law and RA 8424 or the National Internal Revenue Code : On Value-added Tax, VAT-Exempt Transactions, VAT Registration, and other Provisions, including Percentage Tax on Carriers and Keepers of Garages and Franchise Tax
1996-12-20	8242	Renaming a Barangay : Dean Leopoldo Yabes
1996-12-20	8243	Renaming a Barangay : San Mariano
1996-12-30	8244	Appropriation to Fund the Fourth-Year Implementation of the Salary Increases for National Government Personnel
1996-12-30	8245	Appropriation to Fund the Increased Share in the 1997 of the Local Government Units in the National Internal Revenue Taxes
1996-12-30	8246	Amending Batas Pambansa 129 or the Judiciary Reorganization Act of 1980 : Creating Additional Divisions and Justices in the Court of Appeals System
1996-12-30	8247	Amending RA 7919 or the Alien Social Integration Act of 1995 : Exempting Aliens who have Acquired Permanent Residency under E.O. 324

=== 1995 (7854–8176) ===
Date approved	RA number	Title/category
1995-01-02	7854	Converting a Municipality into a Highly Urbanized City (Makati, NCR)
1994-12-31	7855	Establishing a Municipal Hospital (Balabac, Palawan)
1994-12-31	7856	Establishing a Municipal Hospital : San Vicente Municipal Hospital (San Vicente, Palawan)
1995-01-21	7857	Increasing Bed Capacity of a Hospital : Roxas District Hospital (Roxas, Oriental Mindoro)
1995-01-21	7858	Renaming an Educational Institution : Rizal State College (Tanay, Rizal)
1995-01-21	7859	Telecommunications Franchise Renewal : Worldwide Communications, Inc. (Nationwide)
1995-01-21	7860	Radio and Television Broadcasting Franchise : Cagayan Satellite Program Network, Inc (Luzon)
1995-01-21	7861	Converting a High School Annex into an Independent National High School : Datu Piang National High School (Datu Piang, Maguindanao)
1995-01-21	7862	Converting a High School Annex into an Independent National High School : Evaristo Moralizon National Vocational High School (Manay, Davao Oriental)
1995-01-21	7863	Converting a High School into a National High School : Agustin F. Escaño National High School (Tomas Oppus, Southern Leyte)
1995-01-21	7864	Establishing a National High School : Adlay National High School (Carrascal, Surigao Del Sur)
1995-01-21	7865	Establishing a National High School : Tomas Avila Andaya Sr. National High School (Ragay, Camarines Sur)
1995-01-21	7866	Establishing a National High School : Olandang National High School (Midsayap, North Cotabato)
1995-01-21	7867	Establishing a National High School : San Andres National High School (Kadingilan, Bukidnon)
1995-01-21	7868	Establishing a National High School : Western Abra National High School (Danglas, Abra)
1995-01-21	7869	Establishing a High School : San Agapito High School (Batangas City, Batangas)
1995-01-21	7870	Establishing a National High School : Brooke's Point National High School (Brooke's Point, Palawan)
1995-01-21	7871	Establishing a National High School : Aguining National High School (President Garcia, Bohol)
1995-01-21	7872	Establishing a National High School : Dingalan National High School (Dingalan, Aurora)
1995-01-21	7873	Establishing a National High School : Panamao National High School (Panamao, Sulu District II (NEED INFO))
1995-01-21	7874	Converting a High School into an Extension High School : San Enrique Polytechnic College Dominador Abang Memorial Extension High School (San Enrique, Iloilo)
1995-02-14	7875	National Health Insurance Act of 1995 : Repealing PD 1519 or the Revised Philippine Medical Care Act (Nationwide)
1995-02-14	7876	Senior Citizens Center Act of the Philippines (Nationwide)
1995-02-14	7877	Anti-Sexual Harassment Act of 1995 (Nationwide)
1995-02-14	7878	Creating a Provinces : Kalinga and Apayao
1995-02-14	7879	Converting a college into a State College : Davao Del Norte State College (NEED INFO) (Panabo, Davao)
1995-02-20	7880	Fair and Equitable Access to Education Act (Nationwide)
1995-02-20	7881	Amending the Comprehensive Agrarian Reform Law of 1998 or RA 6657 (Nationwide)
1995-02-20	7882	Providing Assistance to Women in Micro- and Cottage Business Enterprises (Nationwide)
1995-02-20	7883	Barangay Health Workers' Benefits and Incentives Act of 1995 (Nationwide)
1995-02-20	7884	National Dairy Development Act of 1995 (Nationwide)
1995-02-20	7885	Amending RA 7170 or the Organ Donation Act of 1991 : Advancing Organ Transplantation in the Philippines (Nationwide)
1995-02-20	7886	EXTENDING THE TERM OF THE COMMITTEE ON PRIVATIZATION AND THE ASSET PRIVATIZATION TRUST AMENDING FOR THE PURPOSE REPUBLIC ACT NUMBERED SEVEN THOUSAND SIX HUNDRED SIXTY-ONE.
1995-02-20	7887	Amending RA 7166 : Provisions on the Election of the Members of the Sangguniang Panlalawigan, Sangguniang Panlungsod and Sangguniang Bayan (Nationwide)
1995-02-20	7888	Amending the Omnibus Investments Code of 1987 or EO 226 : On the Power and Duties of the Board of Investments (Nationwide)
1995-02-20	7889	University of the Philippines in Mindanao Act (Davao City, Davao Del Sur)
1995-02-20	7890	Amending the Revised Penal Code or Act 3815 : On Grave Coercions (Nationwide)
1995-02-20	7891	Subdividing a Province : Isabela Del Norte and Isabela Del Sur (Rejected by the Plebiscite) (Isabela)
1995-02-20	7892	Establishing a Hospital : Pangasinan Provincial Hospital (Lingayen, Pangasinan)
1995-02-20	7893	Converting a Hospital into a Medical Center : Region I Medical Center (Dagupan City, Pangasinan)
1995-02-20	7894	Converting a college into a State College : Siargao National College of Science and Technology (Del Carmen, Surigao Del Norte)
1995-02-20	7895	Converting a High School into a State College : Josefina H. Cerilles Polytechnic College (San Miguel, Zamboanga Del Sur)
1995-02-20	7896	Creating a Municipality : Sibunag (Jordan, Nueva Valencia, and Sibunag in Guimaras)
1995-02-20	7897	Creating a Municipality : San Lorenzo (Buenavista, Jordan, and San Lorenzo in Guimaras)
1995-02-23	7898	AFP Modernization Act (Nationwide)
1995-02-23	7899	Amending RA 4726 or the Condominium Act : On the Enabling or Master Deed and the Condominium Corporation (Nationwide)
1995-02-23	7900	High-Value Crops Development Act of 1995 (Nationwide)
1995-02-23	7901	Creating an Administrative Region : Caraga Administrative Region (Agusan del Norte, Agusan del Sur, Surigao del Norte, and Surigao del Sur)
1995-02-23	7902	Amending BP 129 or the Judiciary Reorganization Act of 1980 : Expanding the Jurisdiction of the Court of Appeals (Nationwide)
1995-02-23	7903	Zamboanga City Special Economic Zone Act of 1995 (Zamboanga City, Zamboanga Del Norte)
1995-02-23	7904	Amending BP 881 or the Omnibus Election Code : On the Provision of Official Sample Ballots, Voters Information Sheet and List of Candidates (Nationwide)
1995-02-23	7905	Amending the Comprehensive Agrarian Reform Law of 1998 or RA 6657 : Strengthening the Implementation of CARL (Nationwide)
1995-02-23	7906	Thrift Banks Act of 1995 (Nationwide)
1995-02-23	7907	Amending RA 3844 or the Code of Agrarian Reform in the Philippines : On the Land Bank of the Philippines (Nationwide)
1995-02-23	7908	Radio Paging Franchise : Multi-Media Telephony Incorporated (Nationwide)
1995-02-23	7909	Air Transport Franchise for Domestic Service : Pacific Airways Corporation (Nationwide)
1995-02-23	7910	Converting a State College into a State University : Leyte Normal University (Tacloban City, Leyte)
1995-02-23	7911	Amending RA 7336 : On the Administration and Offerings of the Ramon Magsaysay Polytechnic College (Iba, Zambales)
1995-02-23	7912	Converting a High School into a State College : Cauayan Polytechnic College (Cauayan, Isabela)
1995-02-23	7913	Integrating Colleges into a State College : Bataan State College (Dinalupihan and Samal in Bataan)
1995-02-23	7914	Renaming an Educational Institution : Bataan National Polytechnic School (Orani, Bataan)
1995-02-23	7915	Converting a college into a State College : Balicuatro College of Arts and Trades (Allen, Northern Samar)
1995-02-24	7916	The Special Economic Zone Act of 1995 (Nationwide)
1995-02-24	7917	Amending RA 7227 or the Bases Conversion and Development Act of 1992 : On the Funding Scheme Provisions (Nationwide)
1995-02-24	7918	Amending the Omnibus Investments Code of 1987 or EO 226 : On the Incentives to Registered Enterprises (Nationwide)
1995-02-24	7919	The Alien Social Integration Act of 1995 (Nationwide)
1995-02-24	7920	New Electrical Engineering Law : Repealing RA 184 or the Electrical Engineering Law (Nationwide)
1995-02-24	7921	Radio and Television Broadcasting Franchise : Sumoroy Broadcasting Corporation (Region 8)
1995-02-24	7922	Cagayan Special Economic Zone Act of 1995 (Santa Ana and Aparri in Cagayan)
1995-02-24	7923	Integrating Colleges into a State College : Camiguin Polytechnic State College (Catarman and Mambajao in Camiguin)
1995-03-01	7924	Reconstituting a Government Agency : Metro Manila Development Authority : Repealing EO 392 (NCR)
1995-03-01	7925	Public Telecommunications Policy Act of the Philippines (Nationwide)
1995-03-01	7926	Converting a Municipality into a Highly Urbanized City (Muntinlupa, NCR)
1995-03-01	7927	Converting a college into a State College : Batanes Polytechnic College (Basco, Batanes)
1995-03-01	7928	Converting a Component College into an Independent State College : Puerto Princesa School of Arts and Trades (Puerto Princesa, Palawan)
1995-03-01	7929	Converting a Component College into an Independent State College : Romblon College of Science and Fisheries Technology (San Agustin, Romblon)
1995-03-01	7930	Converting a college into a State College : Southern Leyte State College of Science and Technology (Sogod, Southern Leyte)
1995-03-01	7931	Converting a School into a college : Southern Leyte Institute of Agriculture and Technology (Hinunangan, Southern Leyte)
1995-03-01	7932	Converting a college into a State College : Agusan del Sur State College of Agriculture and Technology (Bunawan, Agusan Del Sur)
1995-03-01	7933	Converting a college into a State College : Rizal Polytechnic College (Morong, Rizal)
1995-03-01	7934	Converting a High School into a State College : Victorino Salcedo Polytechnic College (Sara, Iloilo)
1995-03-01	7935	Converting a High School into a State College : Adiong Memorial Polytechnic College (Ditsaan-Ramain, Lanao Del Sur)
1995-03-01	7936	Converting a High School into a State College : San Francisco Institute of Science and Technology (Malilipot, Albay)
1995-03-01	7937	Converting a Hospital into a Regional Hospital : Mayor Hilarion A. Ramiro Sr. Regional Training and Teaching Hospital (Ozamiz City, Misamis Occidental)
1995-03-01	7938	Converting a Regional Hospital into a Medical Center : Northern Mindanao Medical Center (Cagayan De Oro City, Misamis Oriental)
1995-03-01	7939	Telecommunications Franchise : Island Country Telecommunications, Inc (Nationwide)
1995-03-01	7940	Radio Broadcasting Franchise Amendment :Infocom Communications Network, Inc (Nationwide)
1995-03-03	7941	Party-List System Act (Nationwide)
1995-03-03	7942	Philippine Mining Act of 1995 (Nationwide)
1995-03-03	7943	Converting a Hospital into a Medical Center : Amai Pakpak Medical Center (Marawi City, Lanao Del Sur)
1995-03-03	7944	Converting a college into a State College : Guimaras Polytechnic College (Buenavista, Guimaras)
1995-03-03	7945	Renaming an Educational Institution : Dr. Emilio B. Espinosa Sr. Memorial State College of Agriculture and Technology (Mandaon, Masbate)
1995-03-03	7946	Converting a High School into a National High School : San Roque National High School (Talisay, Cebu)
1995-03-03	7947	Converting a college into a State College : Siquijor State College (Larena, Siquijor)
1995-03-03	7948	Converting a college into a State College : Camarines Sur Institute of Fisheries and Marine Sciences (Pasacao, Camarines Sur)
1995-03-09	7949	Telecommunications Franchise Renewal : Philippine Communications Satellite Corporation (Nationwide)
1995-03-25	7950	Declaring Every December 18 a Special Working Holiday in Laguna Province in Commemoration of the "Araw ng Laguna" and the Death of Governor Felicisimo T. San Luis (Laguna)
1995-03-25	7951	Establishing a National High School : San Antonio National High School (Barotac Viejo, Iloilo)
1995-03-24	7952	Establishing a National High School : Estancia National High School (Estancia, Iloilo)
1995-03-30	7953	Horse Racing Franchise Renewal : Philippine Racing Club Inc (NCR, Rizal, Laguna, and Cavite)
1995-03-29	7954	Establishing a National Park : Bangan Hill National Park (Bayombong, Nueva Vizcaya)
1995-03-29	7955	Establishing a Hospital : Marilog District Hospital (Davao City, Davao Del Sur)
1995-03-29	7956	Establishing a Hospital : Diadi Emergency Hospital (Diadi, Nueva Vizcaya)
1995-03-29	7957	Converting a college into a State College : Calabanga Polytechnic College (Calabanga, Camarines Sur)
1995-03-29	7958	Establishing a State College : Tinambac Polytechnic Institute (Tinambac, Camarines Sur)
1995-03-29	7959	Converting a college into a State College : Burauen Polytechnic College (Burauen, Leyte)
1995-03-294	7960	Integrating Colleges into a State College : Ilocos Sur Polytechnic College (Ilocos Sur)
1995-03-29	7961	Telecommunications Franchise : Cruz Telephone Company, Inc (CRUZTELCO) (Nationwide)
1995-03-30	7962	Radio and Television Broadcasting Franchise : Philippine Broadcasting Corporation (Nationwide)
1995-03-30	7963	Radio and Television Broadcasting Franchise : Cebu Broadcasting Company (Nationwide)
1995-03-30	7964	Radio and Television Broadcasting Franchise : Insular Broadcasting System, Inc (Nationwide)
1995-03-30	7965	Radio and Television Broadcasting Franchise : Satellite Broadcasting Incorporated (Regions I and II and the Cordillera Region)
1995-03-30	7966	Radio and Television Broadcasting Franchise : ABS-CBN Broadcasting Corporation (Nationwide)
1995-03-30	7967	Radio and Television Broadcasting Franchise : Pacific Broadcasting System, Inc
1995-03-30	7968	Radio Broadcasting Franchise Amendment : Expanding Franchise Area of ZOE Broadcasting Network, Inc (Nationwide)
1995-03-30	7969	Cable/Community Antenna Television System Franchise : Central CATV, Inc. (Nationwide)
1995-03-30	7970	Local Exchange Network Franchise : Maranao Telephone Company : Repealing RA 652 (Lanao Del Norte)
1995-03-30	7971	Establishing a Hospital : Aguinaldo Municipal Hospital (Aguinaldo, Ifugao)
1995-03-30	7972	Converting a High School into a college : San Jose Polytechnic Institute (San Jose, Camarines Sur)
1995-04-02	7973	Converting a High School into a college : Sigma College of Science and Technology (Sigma, Capiz)
1995-03-30	7974	Converting a High School into a college : Janiuay Polytechnic College (Janiuay, Iloilo)
1995-03-30	7975	Amending PD 1606 : On the Functional and Structural Organization of the Sandiganbayan (Nationwide)
1995-04-14	7976	Establishing a District Engineering Office (Alabat, Atimonan, Calauag, Guinayangan, Gumaca, Lopez, Perez, Plaridel, Quezon, and Tagkawayan in Quezon)
1995-04-14	7977	Converting a School into a college : Marcelino R. Veloso National Polytechnic College (Tabango, Leyte)
1995-04-17	7978	Horse Racing Franchise : Metro Manila Turf Club, Inc. (Caloocan, NCR)
1995-04-22	7979	Renaming a Hospital : Don Santiago A. Hahial Sr. Memorial Hospital (Dinas, Zamboanga Del Sur)
1995-04-22	7980	Changing the name of an Elementary School : Dean Leopoldo Yabes Memorial Elementary School (Sinait, Ilocos Sur)
1995-04-22	7981	Converting a High School Annex into an Independent National High School : Barangay Capitan Ramon National High School (Silay City, Negros Occidental)
1995-04-22	7982	Establishing a National High School : Central Taytay National High School (Taytay, Palawan)
1995-04-22	7983	Establishing a High School : San Gabriel Vocational High School (San Gabriel, La Union)
1995-04-22	7984	Establishing a High School (NEED INFO) (San Isidro, Davao Oriental)
1995-04-22	7985	Establishing a High School : San Isidro High School (Duero, Bohol)
1995-04-22	7986	Establishing a National High School : Belen National High School (San Ildefonso, Ilocos Sur)
1995-04-22	7987	Establishing a National High School : Batasan Hills National High School (Quezon City, NCR)
1995-04-22	7988	Establishing a National High School : Valladolid National High School (Valladolid, Negros Occidental)
1995-04-22	7989	Establishing a National High School : Madaymen National High School (Kibungan, Benguet)
1995-04-22	7990	Establishing a National High School : Dikapinisan National High School (San Luis, Aurora)
1995-04-22	7991	Establishing a National High School : Western Bicutan National High School (Taguig, NCR)
1995-04-22	7992	Establishing a National High School : Sibuyao National High School (Torrijos, Marinduque)
1995-04-22	7993	Establishing a National High School : Trading National High School (Davao City, Davao Del Sur)
1995-04-22	7994	Converting a High School into a National High School : Balagunan National High School (Santo Tomas, Davao)
1995-04-22	7995	Converting a High School into a college : Barotac Nuevo Polytechnic Institute (Barotac Nuevo, Iloilo)
1995-04-22	7996	Converting a High School into a National High School : Dr. Gerardo Sabal Memorial National High School (Claveria, Misamis Oriental)
1995-04-22	7997	Changing the Name of a National High School : Burauen Comprehensive National High School (NEED INFO) (Burauen, Leyte)
1995-04-22	7998	Converting a High School into a National High School : Tubod National High School (Minglanilla, Cebu)
1995-04-22	7999	Amending Presidential Proclamation 843 : Reapportioning the Tala Estate for Housing (Caloocan, NCR)
1995-04-22	8000	Declaring a Tourism Spot : Ardent Spring (Mambajao, Camiguin)
1995-04-23	8001	Declaring a Tourism Spot : Dalama Shoreline (Molundo, Lanao Del Sur)
1995-04-22	8002	Declaring a Tourism Spot : MacArthur Landing Site (Palo, Leyte)
1995-04-22	8003	Declaring a Tourism Spot: Asinan Area, Las Piñas Church and Bamboo Organ, Las Piñas Bridge, Father Diego Cera Bridge an old Hospital (Las Piñas, NCR)
1995-04-27	8004	Telecommunications Franchise : Millennia Telecommunications Corporation (Nationwide)
1995-05-07	8005	Converting a High School into a college : Ajuy Polytechnic College (Ajuy, Iloilo)
1995-05-18	8006	Converting a High School into a National High School : Perez National High School (Perez, Quezon)
1995-05-25	8007	Converting a college into a State College : Mindoro State College of Agriculture and Technology (Victoria, Oriental Mindoro)
1995-05-25	8008	Converting a National High School into a National Science High School : Danawan Science High School (Magsaysay, Palawan)
1995-05-25	8009	Renaming an Educational Institution : Leyte National College of Agriculture, Science and Technology (Villaba, Leyte)
1995-05-25	8010	Converting a High School into a National High School : Vicente Madrigal National High School (Binangonan, Rizal)
1995-05-25	8011	Renaming an Educational Institution : Leyte College of Arts and Trades (Tanauan, Leyte)
1995-05-25	8012	Renaming an Educational Institution : State Polytechnic College of Palawan (Aborlan, Palawan)
1995-05-25	8013	Converting a High School Annex into an Independent National High School : Tudela National Comprehensive High School (Tudela, Misamis Occidental)
1995-05-25	8014	Converting a High School Annex into an Independent National High School : Balao National High School (Barili, Cebu)
1995-05-25	8015	Converting a High School Annex into an Independent National High School : Telesforo S. Singson High School (Davao City, Davao Del Sur)
1995-05-25	8016	Renaming an Educational Institution : Cecilio Putong National High School (Tagbilaran City, Bohol)
1995-05-25	8017	Renaming an Educational Institution : Inocencio V. Ferrer Memorial School of Fisheries (Talisay, Negros Occidental)
1995-05-25	8018	Renaming an Educational Institution : Philippine Children's Medical Center (Quezon City, NCR)
1995-05-25	8019	Converting a Hospital into a Medical Center : Amang Rodriguez Medical Center (Marikina, NCR)
1995-05-25	8020	Renaming a Hospital : National Kidney and Transplant Institute (Quezon City, NCR)
1995-05-25	8021	Declaring a Tourism Event : Moriones Festival (Marinduque)
1995-05-25	8022	Declaring a Tourism Zone : Boac, Buenavista, and Torrijos (Boac, Buenavista, and Torrijos in Marinduque)
1995-05-25	8023	Declaring a Tourism Spot : Man-made Lake in Balo-i (Balo-i, Lanao Del Norte)
1995-05-25	8024	Declaring a Tourism Spot : Busay Falls (Babatngon, Leyte)
1995-05-25	8025	Radio and Television Broadcasting Franchise : Golden Broadcast Professional, Inc (Mindanao)
1995-05-25	8026	Radio Broadcasting Franchise : Beta Broadcasting System Corporation (Luzon)
1995-05-25	8027	Radio and Television Broadcasting Franchise : Kaissar Broadcasting Network, Inc (KBNI) (Nationwide)
1995-06-05	8028	Renaming a Road : Filomeno Montejo Highway (Tacloban, Santa Fe, Pastrana, Dagami, and Tanauan in Leyte)
1995-06-05	8029	Renaming a Bridge : Ambassador Jacinto Castel Borja Bridge (Tagbilaran City, Dauis, and Panglao in Bohol)
1995-06-05	8030	Adjusting/Correcting Territorial Boundaries : Palayan City and Bongabon (Nueva Ecija)
1995-06-05	8031	Radio and Television Broadcasting Franchise : St. Jude Thaddeus Institute of Technology, Inc (Surigao Del Norte (NEED INFO))
1995-06-05	8032	Radio Broadcasting Franchise : Philippine Radio Corporation (Nationwide)
1995-06-05	8033	Converting a High School Annex into an Independent National High School : Mendoza National Agricultural High School (Roxas, Palawan)
1995-06-05	8034	Converting a High School Annex into an Independent National High School : Tacloban National Agricultural School (Tacloban City, Leyte)
1995-06-05	8035	Converting a High School Annex into an Independent National High School : Cayangwan National High School (Makato, Aklan)
1995-06-05	8036	Converting a High School Annex into an Independent National High School : Cayangwan National High School (Godod, Zamboanga Del Norte)
1995-06-05	8037	Establishing a National High School : Matangad National High School (Gitagum, Misamis Oriental)
1995-06-05	8038	Establishing a National High School : La Libertad National High School (La Libertad, Negros Oriental)
1995-06-05	8039	Converting a High School Annex into an Independent National High School : Signal Village National High School (Taguig, NCR)
1995-06-05	8040	Converting a High School into a National High School : Taytay National High School (Taytay, Rizal)
1995-06-07	8041	National Water Crisis Act of 1995 (Nationwide)
1995-06-07	8042	Migrant Workers and Overseas Filipinos Act of 1995 (Nationwide)
1995-06-07	8043	Inter-Country Adoption Act of 1995 (Nationwide)
1995-06-07	8044	Youth in Nation-Building Act (Nationwide)
1995-06-07	8045	Amending RA 7166 : On the Number of Copies of Election Returns and their Distribution (Nationwide)
1995-06-07	8046	Authorizing the COMELEC to Demonstrate and Pilot-Test the Computerized Election System (Nationwide)
1995-06-07	8047	Book Publishing Industry Development Act : Repealing E.O. 492 (s. 1991) (Nationwide)
1995-06-07	8048	Coconut Preservation Act of 1995 (Nationwide)
1995-06-07	8049	"The Anti-Hazing Act of 1995" (Nationwide)
1995-06-07	8050	Revised Optometry Law of 1995 : Repealing the Optometry Law or RA 1998 (Nationwide)
1995-06-15	8051	Converting a Hospital into a Regional Hospital : Bicol Regional Training and Teaching Hospital (Legazpi City, Albay)
1995-06-15	8052	Converting a Hospital into a District Hospital : Cateel District Hospital (Cateel, Davao Oriental)
1995-06-15	8053	Converting a Hospital into a Medical Center : Bicol Medical Center (Naga City, Camarines Sur)
1995-06-15	8054	Establishing a Hospital : Panamao District Hospital (Panamao, Sulu)
1995-06-15	8055	Establishing a National High School : San Luis National High School (San Luis, Aurora)
1995-06-15	8056	Establishing a National High School : Barangay Datu Balong National High School (Kapalong, Davao)
1995-06-15	8057	Renaming an Educational Institution : Philippine Science High School-Eastern Visayas Campus (Palo, Leyte)
1995-06-15	8058	Declaring a National Historical Landmark : Ancestral Houses in Silay City (Silay City, Negros Occidental)
1995-06-15	8059	Declaring a Tourism Zone : Barangay Patag (Silay City, Negros Occidental)
1995-07-06	8060	Radio and Television Broadcasting Franchise : Palawan Broadcasting Corporation (Nationwide)
1995-06-15	8061	Radio and Television Broadcasting Franchise : Advanced Media Broadcasting System, Inc (Nationwide)
1995-06-15	8062	Radio Broadcasting Franchise : Ditan Communications, Inc. (Visayas and Mindanao)
1995-06-15	8063	Radio Broadcasting Franchise : Beacon Communications Systems, Inc (Nationwide)
1995-06-19	8064	Radio and Television Broadcasting Franchise : Pacific Multi-Media Company, Inc (Nationwide)
1995-06-19	8065	Telecommunications Franchise : Isla Cellular Communications, Inc. (Nationwide)
1995-06-19	8066	Radio Paging Franchise : Isla Paging Company, Inc (Nationwide)
1995-06-19	8067	Radio Broadcasting Franchise : Radio Gubat Network, Inc (Albay, Camarines Norte, Camarines Sur, Catanduanes, Masbate, and Sorsogon)
1995-06-19	8068	Radio and Television Broadcasting Franchise : Agusan Communications Foundation, Inc (Agusan Del Sur)
1995-06-19	8069	Radio and Television Broadcasting Franchise Amendment : Vanguard Radio Network Company Inc (Regions 6, 7, 10, and 11)
1995-06-19	8070	Radio and Television Broadcasting Franchise : Tirad Pass Radio TV Broadcasting Network, Inc. (Nationwide)
1995-06-19	8071	Radio and Television Broadcasting Franchise : Vismin Radio and Television Broadcasting Network, Inc (Visayas and Mindanao)
1995-06-19	8072	Establishing a National High School : Pundaguitan National High School (Governor Generoso, Davao Oriental)
1995-06-19	8073	Establishing a National High School : Bulusan National Vocational-Technical High School (Bulusan, Sorsogon)
1995-06-19	8074	Establishing a National High School : Carmelo de los Cientos Sr. National Trade School (Padada, Davao Del Sur)
1995-06-19	8075	Converting a High School into a college : Southern Isabela College of Arts and Trades (Santiago, Isabela)
1995-06-19	8076	Converting a School into a college : Polytechnic College of Calapan (Calapan, Oriental Mindoro)
1995-06-24	8077	Radio and Television Broadcasting Franchise : M. I. T. Radio Television Network, Inc (M. I. T. – RTVN) (Mindanao)
1995-07-06	8078	Establishing a National Science High School : Alabel National Science High School (Alabel, Sarangani)
1995-07-06	8079	Radio and Television Broadcasting Franchise : First United Broadcasting Corporation (FUBC) (Nationwide)
1995-07-06	8080	Radio and Television Broadcasting Franchise : Asian-Pacific Broadcasting Company, Inc (Nationwide)
1995-07-06	8081	Radio and Television Broadcasting Franchise : Ultrasonic Broadcasting System, Inc. (Nationwide)
1995-07-06	8082	Radio and Television Broadcasting Franchise : Sulu-Tawi-Tawi Broadcasting Foundation, Inc. (Sulu and Tawi-Tawi)
1995-07-06	8083	Radio Broadcasting Franchise : Radio Audience Developers Integrated Organization, Inc (Nationwide)
1995-07-06	8084	Radio and Television Broadcasting Franchise : Raven Broadcasting Corporation (Nationwide)
1995-07-06	8085	Radio and Television Broadcasting Franchise : Mount Apo Science Foundation School, Inc. (Mindanao)
1995-07-06	8086	Radio Broadcasting Franchise : Brightlight Broadcasting Service Corporation (Nationwide)
1995-07-06	8087	Radio and Television Broadcasting Franchise : Gold Label Broadcasting System, Inc (Visayas and Mindanao)
1995-07-06	8088	Radio and Television Broadcasting Franchise : Trans Radio Broadcasting Corporation (Nationwide)
1995-07-06	8089	Radio Broadcasting Franchise : SolidNorth Broadcasting System (Nationwide)
1995-07-06	8090	Radio Broadcasting Franchise : Association for Islamic Development Service Cooperative (Zamboanga Del Sur)
1995-07-06	8091	Radio and Television Broadcasting Franchise : Crusaders Broadcasting System, Inc (Nationwide)
1995-07-06	8092	Radio and Television Broadcasting Franchise : Bicol Broadcasting Systems, Inc (BBSI) (Region V)
1995-07-06	8093	Radio and Television Broadcasting Franchise : Calbayog Community Broadcasting Corporation (Samar Island)
1995-07-06	8094	Radio and Television Broadcasting Franchise : Ipil Broadcasting News Network, Inc (Zamboanga Del Sur)
1995-07-06	8095	Telecommunications Franchise : Islatel Corporation (Nationwide)
1995-07-06	8096	Radio Broadcasting Franchise : Allied Broadcasting Center, Incorporated (Nationwide)
1995-07-06	8097	Radio and Television Broadcasting Franchise : Partido Broadcasting Corporation (Bicol Region)
1995-07-06	8098	Radio and Television Broadcasting Franchise : Broadcast Enterprises and Affiliated Media (BEAM) Inc (Nationwide)
1995-07-07	8099	Radio and Television Broadcasting Franchise : Sagay Broadcasting Corporation (SBC) (Nationwide)
1995-07-07	8100	Radio and Television Broadcasting Franchise : First Love Broadcasting Network, Inc (Visayas and Mindanao)
1995-07-07	8101	Radiotelephone Franchise : Edison C. Espinosa (Region VI)
1995-07-07	8102	Radio Broadcasting Franchise : Ultimate Entertainment, Inc (Nationwide)
1995-07-09	8103	Air Transport Franchise for Domestic and international Service : All Asia Airlines Co, Inc. (Nationwide)
1995-07-09	8104	Radio and Television Broadcasting Franchise Renewal : Rajah Broadcasting Network, Incorporated (Nationwide)
1995-07-09	8105	Radio and Television Broadcasting Franchise Amendment : Kalayaan Broadcasting System, Inc (Mindanao)
1995-07-09	8106	Radio and Television Broadcasting Franchise : Caceres Broadcasting Corporation (Luzon)
1995-07-09	8107	Radio and Television Broadcasting Franchise : Byers Communications, Inc (NCR and Region VII)
1995-07-09	8108	Radio and Television Broadcasting Franchise : Mareco Broadcasting Network, Inc (Nationwide)
1995-07-09	8109	Radio Broadcasting Franchise : Notre Dame Broadcasting Corporation (Nationwide)
1995-07-09	8110	Radio and Television Broadcasting Franchise : National Council of Churches in the Philippines, Inc (Nationwide)
1995-07-09	8111	Radio and Television Broadcasting Franchise : Cadiz Radio and Television Network, Inc (Cadiz City, Negros Occidental)
1995-07-09	8112	Radio and Television Broadcasting Franchise : Leyte Livelihood Organization Incorporated (Nationwide)
1995-07-09	8113	Radio and Television Broadcasting Franchise : Fairwaves Broadcasting Network (Nationwide)
1995-07-09	8114	Radio and Television Broadcasting Franchise : FBS Radio Network, Inc (Nationwide)
1995-07-09	8115	Radio Broadcasting Franchise : Far East Broadcasting Company (Philippines), Inc (Nationwide)
1995-07-09	8116	Radio and Television Broadcasting Franchise : Vimcontu Broadcasting Corporation (Nationwide)
1995-07-09	8117	Radio Broadcasting Franchise : Sealand Telecommunication Company, Inc (NEED INFO)
1995-07-09	8118	Converting a High School Annex into an Independent National High School : Bagong Barrio National High School (Caloocan, NCR)
1995-07-16	8119	Radio and Television Broadcasting Franchise : Good News Sorsogon Foundation, Inc (Bicol Region)
1995-07-16	8120	Radio and Television Broadcasting Franchise : Andres Bonifacio College Broadcasting System, Inc (Mindanao)
1995-07-16	8121	Radio Broadcasting Franchise : M.S. Network Management, Inc (Nationwide)
1995-07-16	8122	Radio and Television Broadcasting Franchise : Swara Sug Media Corporation of the Philippines (Nationwide)
1995-07-16	8123	Radio and Television Broadcasting Franchise : Royal Broadcasting Corporation (Nationwide)
1995-07-16	8124	Radio and Television Broadcasting Franchise : Audiovisual Communicators, Inc (Nationwide)
1995-07-16	8125	Radio Broadcasting Franchise : Makati Broadcasting Company, Inc (Nationwide)
1995-07-16	8126	Radio and Television Broadcasting Franchise : R.T. Broadcast Specialist Philippines (Mindanao)
1995-07-16	8127	Radio and Television Broadcasting Franchise : Servotron Industries, Inc (NCR)
1995-07-16	8128	Radio and Television Broadcasting Franchise : Oriental Mindoro Management Resources Corporation (OMARCO) (Nationwide)
1995-07-16	8129	Radio and Television Broadcasting Franchise : GVM Radio/TV Corporation (Nationwide)
1995-07-16	8130	Radio Broadcasting Franchise : Christian Music Power, Inc (Nationwide)
1995-07-16	8131	Radio and Television Broadcasting Franchise : Alyala Broadcasting Corporation (Sorsogon)
1995-07-16	8132	Radio and Television Broadcasting Franchise : Jose M. Luison and Sons, Inc. (Nationwide)
1995-07-16	8133	Radio and Television Broadcasting Franchise : Century Communications Marketing Center, Inc (Nationwide)
1995-07-16	8134	Radio and Television Broadcasting Franchise : Primax Broadcasting Network, Inc (Nationwide)
1995-07-16	8135	Radio and Television Broadcasting Franchise : Amcara Broadcasting Network, Incorporated (Nationwide)
1995-07-16	8136	Establishing a Hospital : San Jose Municipal Hospital (San Jose, Surigao Del Norte)
1995-07-16	8137	Establishing a Hospital : Ramon Municipal Hospital (Ramon, Isabela)
1995-07-16	8138	Establishing a Vocational School : Concepcion Vocational School (Concepcion, Tarlac)
1995-07-16	8139	Establishing a National Science High School : Tandag National Science High School (Tandag, Surigao Del Sur)
1995-07-16	8140	Establishing a National High School : Gogon National High School (Donsol, Sorsogon)
1995-07-16	8141	Renaming an Educational Institution : Eastern Samar National Polytechnic School (Borongan, Eastern Samar)
1995-07-16	8142	Converting a High School into a college : Simeon Suan Vocational and Technical College (Bansud, Oriental Mindoro)
1995-07-16	8143	Converting a School into a college : Bongabong College of Fisheries (Bongabong, Oriental Mindoro)
1995-07-29	8144	Radio and Television Broadcasting Franchise : Azimuth Broadcasting Corporation (Nationwide)
1995-07-29	8145	Radio and Television Broadcasting Franchise : Radyo Filipino Corporation
1995-08-26	8146	Granting Citizenship to a Person
1995-09-07	8147	Radio and Television Broadcasting Franchise : Southern Broadcasting Network (Nationwide)
	8148	(NEED INFO)
1995-09-04	8149	Radio and Television Broadcasting Franchise : Tagbilaran Broadcasting System (Visayas)
1995-09-08	8150	Public Works and Highways Infrastructure Program Act of 1995 (Nationwide)
1995-09-04	8151	Declaring Every November 27 a Special Nonworking Holiday in Tarlac Province in Commemoration of the Birth of Benigno "Ninoy" S. Aquino Jr. (Tarlac)
1995-09-04	8152	Radio and Television Broadcasting Franchise : Times Broadcasting Network Corporation (Nationwide)
1995-09-23	8153	Radiotelephone and Radiotelegraph Franchise : Rex Electronics Communications System, Inc (Nationwide)
1995-09-23	8154	Radio and Television Broadcasting Franchise : Prime Broadcasting Network, Incorporated (Nationwide)
1995-09-23	8155	Radio and Television Broadcasting Franchise : United Visayan Broadcasting Corporation, Inc (Central Visayas Region)
1995-09-23	8156	Radio and Television Broadcasting Franchise : Our Lady's Foundation, Inc (Bicol Region)
1995-09-23	8157	Radio and Television Broadcasting Franchise : Northern Mindanoa Broadcasting System, Inc. (Mindanao)
1995-09-23	8158	Radio and Television Broadcasting Franchise Renewal, Transfer, and Amendment : PBN Broadcasting Network, Inc (Nationwide)
1995-09-23	8159	Radio Broadcasting Franchise : DXRA-RMC (Rizal Memorial Colleges) Broadcasting Corporation (Nationwide)
1995-09-23	8160	Radio and Television Broadcasting Franchise : University of the Philippines System (Nationwide)
1995-09-23	8161	Radio and Television Broadcasting Franchise : Negros Broadcasting and Publishing Corporation (Visayas and Mindanao)
1995-09-23	8162	Radio and Television Broadcasting Franchise Amendment : Expanding Franchise Area of Progressive Broadcasting Corporation (Nationwide)
1995-09-23	8163	Radio and Television Broadcasting Franchise : Sorsogon Broadcasting Corporation (Bicol Region)
1995-09-23	8164	Radio Broadcasting Franchise : Mountain Province Broadcasting Corporation (Benguet, Ifugao, Kalinga, Apayao, and Mountain Province)
1995-09-23	8165	Radiotelephone and Radiotelegraph Franchise : AZ Communications Network, Inc (Nationwide)
1995-09-23	8166	Radio and Television Broadcasting Franchise : Peñafrancia Broadcasting Corporation (Bicol Region)
1995-09-23	8167	Radio Broadcasting Franchise : Bayanihan Broadcasting Corporation (Quezon and the eastern Luzon)
1995-09-23	8168	Radio and Television Broadcasting Franchise : Filipinas Broadcasting Network, Inc (FBNI) (Nationwide)
1995-09-23	8169	Radio Broadcasting Franchise : GV Broadcasting System, Inc. (Luzon)
1995-09-25	8170	Radio Broadcasting Franchise : University of Mindanao (Nationwide)
1995-07-03	8171	Providing Repatriation to Filipino Women Married to Aliens and for Natural-Born Filipinos after Losing Their Philippine Citizenship (Nationwide)
1995-12-20	8172	An Act for Salt Iodization Nationwide (ASIN) (Nationwide)
	8173	NEED INFO
1995-12-29	8174	Appropriations Act of 1996 (Nationwide)
1995-12-29	8175	Revised Charter of the Philippine Crop Insurance Corporation Act of 1995 (Nationwide)
1995-12-29	8176	Amending RA 7647: Changing the Date of Elections for Elective Officials of the Autonomous Region for Muslim Mindanao (ARMM)

=== 1994 (7667–7853) ===
Date approved	RA number	Title/category
1994-01-17	7667	Declaring a Tourism Spot : Bustos Dam and Tourist Resort (Bustos, Bulacan)
1994-01-17	7668	Declaring a Tourism Spot : Mount Samat (Bataan)
1994-01-10	7669	Declaring Every March 27 a Special Nonworking Holiday in San Juan Municipality in Commemoration of its Foundation (San Juan, NCR)
1994-01-10	7670	Declaring Every June 15 a Special Nonworking Holiday in Cagayan De Oro City in Commemoration of its Cityhood (Cagayan de Oro City, Misamis Oriental)
1994-01-10	7671	Declaring Every June 19 a Special Nonworking Holiday in Surigao del Sur Province in Commemoration of its Foundation (Surigao Del Sur)
1994-01-10	7672	Declaring Every June 18 a Special Nonworking Holiday in Benguet Province in Commemoration of its Foundation (Benguet)
1994-01-10	7673	Declaring Every September 17 a Special Nonworking Holiday in Siquijor Province in Commemoration of its Foundation (Siquijor)
1994-01-17	7674	Telecommunications Franchise Amendment : Telecommunications Technologies Philippines, Incorporated (Nationwide)
1994-02-09	7675	Converting a Municipality into a Highly Urbanized City (Mandaluyong, NCR)
1994-01-10	7676	Declaring Every June 30 a Special Nonworking Holiday in Tacloban City in Celebration of its Feast of Señor Santo Niño (Tacloban City, Leyte)
1994-01-10	7677	Declaring Every October 16 a Special Nonworking Holiday in Oroquieta City in Celebration of its Annual Fiesta (Oroquieta City, Misamis Occidental)
1994-02-17	7678	Telecommunications Franchise : Digital Telecommunications Philippines, Incorporated (Nationwide)
1994-02-24	7679	Creating a Municipality : Sofronio Española (Brooke's Point and Sofronio Española in Palawan)
1994-02-23	7680	Declaring Every August 6 a Special Nonworking Holiday in Palo Municipality in Celebration of its Annual Fiesta (Palo, Leyte)
1994-02-23	7681	Declaring Every May 8 a Special Nonworking Holiday in Tolosa Municipality in Celebration of its Annual Fiesta (Tolosa, Leyte)
1994-02-23	7682	Declaring Every March 9 a Special Nonworking Holiday in Abra Province in Commemoration of its Foundation (Abra)
1994-02-23	7683	Declaring Every July 22 a Special Nonworking Holiday in Bohol Province in Commemoration of its Foundation (Bohol)
1994-02-23	7684	Declaring Every March 4 a Special Nonworking Holiday in Puerto Princesa City in Commemoration of its Foundation (Puerto Princesa City, Palawan)
1994-02-23	7685	Declaring Every March 16 a Special Nonworking Holiday in Davao City in Commemoration of its Cityhood (Davao City, Davao Del Sur)
1994-02-25	7686	Dual Training System Act of 1994 (Nationwide)
1994-03-02	7687	Science and Technology Scholarship Act of 1994 (Nationwide)
1994-03-03	7688	Amending RA 1161 or the Social Security Act of 1954 : Women's Representation in the Social Security Commission (Nationwide)
1994-03-07	7689	Declaring Every August 15 a Special Nonworking Holiday in Tanauan Municipality in Celebrationof its Annual Fiesta (Tanauan, Leyte)
1994-03-07	7690	Declaring a Tourism Spot : Arayat National Park (Arayat, Pampanga)
1994-03-25	7691	Amending BP 129 or the Judiciary Reorganization Act of 1980 : Expanding the Jurisdiction of the Metropolitan Trial Courts, Municipal Trial Courts, and Municipal Circuit Trial Courts as well as Provision on the Jurisdiction of the Regional Trial Courts (Nationwide)
1994-03-25	7692	Telecommunications Franchise : Bell Telecommunications Philippines, Inc (Nationwide)
1994-04-09	7693	Changing the name of a High School : Felizardo C. Lipana Memorial High School (Guiguinto, Bulacan)
1994-04-09	7694	Changing the name of a High School : Toledo S. Pantilo Sr. Elementary School (Sison, Surigao Del Norte)
1994-04-09	7695	Changing the name of an Elementary School : Francisco S. Bactung Memorial Primary School (Banate, Iloilo)
1994-04-09	7696	Amending RA 6948 : Redefining the Eligibility to and Other Provisions on Veteran's Benefits (Nationwide)
1994-04-17	7697	Changing the name of an Elementary School : Pablo Piatos Sr. Elementary School (Davao City, Davao Del Sur)
1994-04-29	7698	Declaring Every August 6 a Special Nonworking Holiday in Cebu Province in Commemoration of its Foundation (Cebu)
1994-05-01	7699	The Portability Law" on the Contributions to Either the Government Service Insurance System or the Social Security System (Nationwide)
1994-05-01	7700	Amending PD 442 or the Labor Code of the Philippines : On the Cuncurrent Jurisdiction of the Divisions of the National Labor Relations Commission (Nationwide)
1994-05-05	7701	Converting a High School into a National High School : Justimbaste-Remandaban National High School (Tabontabon, Leyte)
1994-05-05	7702	Changing the name of a High School : Cristina B. Gonzales Memorial High School (Bucay, Abra)
1994-05-05	7703	Changing the name of a High School : Benigno S. Aquino National High School (Concepcion, Tarlac)
1994-05-05	7704	Changing the name of an Elementary School : Pedro S. Rada Elementary School (Basud, Camarines Norte)
1994-05-05	7705	Changing the name of a High School : Bernardo Carpio Barangay High School (Davao City, Davao Del Sur)
1994-05-05	7706	Changing the name of a High School : Imus National High School (Imus, Cavite)
1994-05-05	7707	Renaming an Educational Institution : Carlos C. Hilado Memorial State College (Talisay, Negros Occidental)
1994-05-05	7708	Changing the name of an Elementary School : Batayan Elementary School (Kalawit, Zamboanga Del Norte)
1994-05-05	7709	Changing the name of a High School : Malabon National High School (Malabon, NCR)
1994-05-05	7710	Converting a High School into a National High School : Cawit National Comprehensive High School (Boac, Marinduque)
1994-05-05	7711	Changing the name of a High School : Kiling National High School (Tanauan, Leyte)
1994-05-05	7712	Converting a High School Annex into an Independent National High School : Jose P. Rizal National High School (Jose P. Rizal, Palawan)
1994-05-05	7713	Changing the name of a High School : Dasmariñas National High School (Dasmariñas, Cavite)
1994-05-05	7714	Converting a High School Annex into an Independent National High School : Aborlan National High School (Aborlan, Palawan)
1994-05-05	7715	Converting a High School into a National High School : Looc Norte National High School (Asturias, Cebu)
1994-05-05	7716	Amending the National Internal Revenue Code of 1977 : Restructuring the Value Added Tax (VAT) System (Nationwide)
1994-05-05	7717	Amending the National Internal Revenue Code of 1977 : Tax Imposition on Shares of Stocks Listed and Traded through the Local Stock Exchange and through initial public offering (Nationwide)
1994-05-05	7718	Amending RA 6957 or "The Build-Operate-Transfer Law" (Nationwide)
1994-05-05	7719	National Blood Services Act of 1994 : Superseding RA 1517 or the Blood Bank Act (Nationwide)
1994-05-05	7720	Converting a Municipality into a Component City (Santiago City, Isabela)
1994-05-18	7721	Liberalizing the Entry and Scope of Operations of Foreign Banks (Nationwide)
1994-05-18	7722	Higher Education Act of 1994 (Nationwide)
1994-05-19	7723	Radio and Television Broadcasting Franchise : Delta Broadcasting System, Inc (Nationwide)
1994-05-19	7724	Declaring Every October 19 a Special Nonworking Holiday in Bacolod City in Celebration of the Maskara Festival and in the Commemoration of its Cityhood (Nationwide)
1994-05-19	7725	Converting a National High School into a National Comprehensive High School: Atimonan National Comprehensive High School (Atimonan, Quezon)
1994-05-19	7726	Changing the name of a High School : Sapangbato National High School (Angeles City, Pampanga)
1994-05-19	7727	Converting a High School into a National High School : Tunga National High School (Tunga, Leyte)
1994-05-19	7728	Converting a High School Annex into an Independent National High School : Bangaan National High School (Sagada, Mountain Province)
1994-06-02	7729	Amending the National Internal Revenue Code of 1977 : Reducing Excise Tax Rates on Minrals and Quary Resources (Nationwide)
1994-06-02	7730	Amending PD 442 or the Labor Code of the Philippines : Strengthening the Visitorial and Enforcement Powers of the Secretary of Labor and Employment (Nationwide)
1994-06-02	7731	Abolishing the National College Entrance Examination (NCEE) : Repealing PD 146 (Nationwide)
1994-06-03	7732	Establishing a National High School : Maigo National High School (Maigo, Lanao Del Norte)
1994-06-03	7733	Establishing a National High School : Quirino National High School (Quirino, Ilocos Sur)
1994-06-03	7734	Establishing a National High School : Ruben E. Ecleo Sr. National High School (Cagdianao, Surigao Del Norte)
1994-06-03	7735	Establishing a National High School : Lorenzo S. Sarmiento Sr. National High School (Mawab, Davao)
1994-06-03	7736	Establishing a High School Annex : San Enrique Manuel Palu-ay Sr. Memorial Extension High School (San Enrique, Iloilo)
1994-06-03	7737	Establishing a National High School : Dupax del Sur National High School (Dupax del Sur, Nueva Vizcaya)
1994-06-03	7738	Converting a High School Annex into an Independent National High School : Tumauini National High School (Tumauini, Isabela)
1994-06-04	7739	Establishing a High School : Mintal Comprehensive High School (Davao City, Davao Del Sur)
1994-06-10	7740	Declaring Every July 1 a Special Nonworking Holiday in Southern Leyte Province in Commemoration of its Foundation (Southern Leyte)
1994-06-11	7741	Establishing a National High School : Puntalinao High School (Banaybanay, Davao Oriental)
1994-06-17	7742	Amending PD 1752 or the Home Development Mutual Fund Law of 1980 : On Fund's Membership Coverage, Term and Contribution and Fund's Investment on Housing (Nationwide)
1994-06-17	7743	Establishing Public Libraries and Reading Centers in All Congressional Districts, Cities, Municipalities and Barangays (Nationwide)
1994-06-19	7744	Establishing a National High School : Datu Calaca Memorial National Comprehensive High School (Marantao, Lanao Del Sur)
1994-06-19	7745	Establishing a High School : Addalam Region High School (Jones, Isabela)
1994-06-19	7746	Establishing a National High School : Pantabangan National High School (Pantabangan, Nueva Ecija)
1994-06-19	7747	Establishing an Agro-Industrial High School : Kabugao Agro-Industrial High School (Kabugao, Kalinga-Apayao)
1994-06-19	7748	Establishing a National High School : Mexico National High School (Mexico, Pampanga)
1994-06-19	7749	Establishing a National High School : Pantar National High School (Pantar, Lanao Del Norte)
1994-06-19	7750	Establishing a High School : Gonzalo Aler High School (Capalonga, Camarines Norte)
1994-06-19	7751	Establishing a National High School : Lungib National High School (Pilar, Sorsogon)
1994-06-19	7752	Establishing a High School : Teofilo Gensoli Sr. Memorial High School (Bacolod City, Negros Occidental)
1994-06-19	7753	Establishing a National High School : Tagbitan-ag National High School (Samal, Davao)
1994-06-19	7754	Establishing a National High School (NEED INFO) (Manolo Fortich, Bukidnon)
1994-06-19	7755	Establishing a High School : Fatima High School (General Santos City, South Cotabato)
1994-06-19	7756	Establishing a High School : Sicayab High School (Dipolog City, Zamboanga Del Norte)
1994-06-19	7757	Establishing a National High School : Turod National High School (Cabugao, Ilocos Sur)
1994-06-19	7758	Establishing a National High School : Gohang National High School (Banaue, Ifugao)
1994-06-19	7759	Converting a High School Annex into an Independent National High School : Las Piñas East National High School (Las Piiñas, NCR)
1994-06-19	7760	Converting a High School into a National High School : Nanagun National High School (Lumbayanague, Lanao Del Sur)
1994-06-19	7761	Converting a High School into a National High School : Quipot National High School (Janiuay, Iloilo)
1994-06-19	7762	Establishing a National High School : Alfredo Parilla National High School (Palompon, Leyte)
1994-06-19	7763	Establishing a National High School : Malasiqui National High School (Malasiqui, Pangasinan)
1994-06-19	7764	Establishing a National High School (NEED INFO) (Salvador Benedicto, Negros Occidental)
1994-06-19	7765	Establishing a National High School : Oanari National High School (Luna, La Union)
1994-06-19	7766	Establishing a High School : Pagalanggang High School (Dinalupihan, Bataan)
1994-06-19	7767	Establishing a High School : Santa Lucia High School (Pasig, NCR)
1994-06-19	7768	Establishing a National High School : Magsikap National Vocational High School (Rizal, Occidental Mindoro)
1994-06-19	7769	Establishing a National High School : Ambassador Pablo R. Suarez Jr. National High School (Carmen, Bohol)
1994-06-19	7770	Establishing a National High School : Silae National High School (Malaybalay, Bukidnon)
1994-06-19	7771	Declaring Every October 31 a Special Nonworking Holiday in Dumangas Municipality in Commemoration of the Birth of Colonel Quintin D. Salas (Dumangas, Iloilo)
1994-06-23	7772	Establishing a National High School : President Elpidio Quirino National High School (Agoo, La Union)
1994-06-30	7773	Establishing a National High School : Kalawit National High School (Kalawit, Zamboanga Del Norte)
1994-06-30	7774	Establishing a National High School : Bulan National High School (Bulan, Sorsogon)
1994-06-30	7775	Establishing a National High School : Callao Norte National High School (Lasam, Cagayan)
1994-06-30	7776	Establishing a National High School : T'Boli National High School (T'Boli, South Cotabato)
1994-06-30	7777	Establishing a National High School : Paulino Dari National High School (Pitogo, Zamboanga Del Sur)
1994-06-30	7778	Establishing a National High School : Dumaran Mainland National High School (Dumaran, Palawan)
1994-06-30	7779	Establishing a National High School : Astorga National High School (Alangalang, Leyte)
1994-06-30	7780	Converting a High School Annex into an Independent National High School : Calamba National Comprehensive High School (Calamba, Misamis Occidental)
1994-06-30	7781	Establishing a National High School : Barangay Guinbala-on National High School (Silay City, Negros Occidental)
1994-06-30	7782	Establishing a National High School : Formon National High School (Bongabong, Oriental Mindoro)
1994-07-26	7783	Telecommunications Franchise : Major Telecoms, Inc (Nationwide)
1994-08-04	7784	Creating the Teacher Education Council for the Establishment of Teacher Education Centers of Excellence (Nationwide)
1994-08-08	7785	Establishing a Hospital : Kalookan City First District Hospital (Caloocan, NCR)
1994-08-08	7786	Naming a Road : Governor Jose T. Fuentebella National Highway (Pili, Ocampo, Tigaon, Goa, San Jose, and Lagonoy in Camarines Sur)
1994-08-08	7787	Converting a High School into a college : Lemery Polytechnic College (Lemery, Iloilo)
1994-08-08	7788	Declaring Every June 13 a Special Nonworking Holiday in Lasam Municipality in Commemoration of its Foundation (Lasam, Cagayan)
1994-08-08	7789	Declaring Every December 18 a Special Nonworking Holiday in Ballesteros Municipality in Commemoration of its Foundation (Ballesteros, Cagayan)
1994-08-08	7790	Converting a High School Annex into an Independent National High School : Leonard Young Sr. High School (Glan, Sarangani)
1994-08-08	7791	Declaring Every September 29 a Special Nonworking Holiday in San Miguel Municipality in Celebration of its Annual Fiesta (San Miguel, Leyte)
1994-08-08	7792	Declaring Every August 31 a Special Nonworking Holiday in Zambales Province in Commemoration of the Birth of Ramon Magsaysay (Zambales)
1994-08-08	7793	Converting a High School into a National High School : Ipilan National High School (Brooke's Point, Palawan)
1994-08-08	7794	Changing the name of a High School : Ligao National High School (Ligao, Albay)
1994-08-08	7795	Establishing an Annex to a National High School : Santiago Annex (NEED INFO) (General Trias, Cavite)
1994-08-25	7796	Technical Education and Skills Development Act of 1994 or the TESDA Act of 1994 (Nationwide)
1994-08-25	7797	Lengthening the School Calendar (Nationwide)
1994-08-25	7798	Amending BP 232 or the Education Act of 1982 : On the Establishment of Schools (Nationwide)
1994-08-26	7799	Establishing a Hospital : Talisay District Hospital (Talisay, Cebu)
1994-09-01	7800	Establishing a National High School : Optaciano Hilay High School (Davao City, Davao Del Sur)
1994-09-01	7801	Converting a college into a Polytechnic College : Concepcion Polytechnic College (Concepcion, Iloilo)
1994-09-01	7802	Changing the name of a High School : Celestino de Guzman Memorial National High School (Barugo, Leyte)
1994-09-01	7803	Establishing a High School : Taclobo High School (Dumaguete, Negros Oriental)
1994-09-01	7804	Establishing a National High School : Bantayan National High School (Bantayan, Cebu)
1994-09-01	7805	Declaring Every January 28 a Special Nonworking Holiday in Cavite City in Celebration of the Birth of Julian R. Felipe (Cavite City, Cavite)
1994-09-01	7806	Declaring Every March 23 a Special Holiday in Aklan Province in Commemoration of the Death of the Nineteen Martyrs of Aklan (Aklan)
1994-08-30	7807	Establishing a High School : Santa Teresita High School (Santa Teresita, Batangas)
1994-09-02	7808	Amending RA 7160 or the Local Government Code of 1991 : Resetting the Date of Elections for Sangguniang Kabataan (Nationwide)
1994-09-16	7809	Declaring Every September 14 a Special Nonworking Holiday in Sanchez Mira Municipality in Commemoration of its Foundation (Sanchez Mira, Cagayan)
1994-09-26	7810	Establishing a Hospital : Mangogon, Lagonoy Municipal Hospital (Lagonoy, Camarines Sur)
1994-10-26	7811	Establishing a National High School : San Antonio National High School (Milaor, Camarines Sur)
1994-10-26	7812	Converting a High School into a National High School : Rosario National High School (Aloguinsan, Cebu)
1994-10-26	7813	Establishing a National High School : Pansol National High School (Padre Garcia, Batangas)
1994-10-26	7814	Converting a High School into a National High School : Caruray National High School (San Vicente, Palawan)
1994-10-29	7815	Converting a High School Annex into an Independent National High School : Sabangan National High School (Sabangan, Mountain Province)
1994-10-29	7816	Radio and Television Broadcasting Franchise : Manila Broadcasting Company (Nationwide)
1994-11-10	7817	Naming a Road : Carlos Hilado Highway (Bacolod City, Negros Occidental)
1994-11-12	7818	Converting a State College into a State University : Palawan State University (Puerto Princesa, Palawan)
1994-11-18	7819	Converting a High School into a National High School : Don Mariano Salvacion Memorial National High School (Capoocan, Leyte)
1994-11-18	7820	Partido Development Administration Act of 1994 (Sagnay, Tigaon, Goa, San Jose, Lagonoy, Tinambac, Siruma, Presentacion, Garchitorena, and Caramoan in Camarines Sur)
1994-11-18	7821	Radio Broadcasting Franchise : Acacia Broadcasting Corporation (Central Luzon and Northern Luzon)
1994-11-18	7822	Declaring a Tourism Zone : Limasawa Island (Limasawa, Southern Leyte)
1994-11-18	7823	Establishing a National High School : Mogpog National Comprehensive High School (Mogpog, Marinduque)
1994-11-18	7824	Establishing a National High School : Kalanawe II National High School (President Quirino, Sultan Kudarat)
1994-11-18	7825	Converting a High School Annex into an Independent National High School : Suyo National High School (Sagada, Mountain Province)
1994-11-18	7826	Converting a High School Annex into an Independent National High School : Butique National High School (Paracelis, Mountain Province)
1994-11-18	7827	Converting a High School Annex into an Independent National High School : Tinajeros National High School (Malabon, NCR)
1994-12-02	7828	Establishing a Vocational School : Caramoan Vocational-Technical School (Caramoan, Camarines Sur)
1994-12-08	7829	Converting a Municipality into a Highly Urbanized City (Pasig, NCR)
1994-12-08	7830	Separating an Extension Hospital into an Independent Hospital : Saint Anthony Mother and Child Hospital (Cebu City, Cebu)
1994-12-08	7831	Radio and Television Broadcasting Franchise : ABC Development Corporation dba Associated Broadcasting Company (Nationwide)
1994-12-08	7832	Anti-electricity and Electric Transmission Lines/Materials Pilferage Act of 1994 (Nationwide)
1994-12-08	7833	Amending the National Internal Revenue Code of 1977 : On the 13th Month Pay and Other Benefits as Exclusion from Gross Income Computation (Nationwide)
1994-12-11	7834	Establishing a School of Arts and Trades : Baguio City School of Arts and Trades (Baguio, Benguet)
1994-12-16	7835	Comprehensive and Integrated Shelter Financing Act of 1994 (Nationwide)
1994-12-16	7836	Philippine Teachers Professionalization Act of 1994 (Nationwide)
1994-12-16	7837	Granting Permanent Resident Status, Other Rights and Privileges to Filipino Veterans of World War II Who Acquired American Citizenship under U.S. Immigration Act of 1990 (Nationwide)
1994-12-16	7838	Converting a School into a college : Western Aklan Polytechnic College (Ibajay, Aklan)
1994-12-16	7839	Converting a National High School into a School of Arts and Trades : Cagayan de Oro (Bugo) School of Arts and Trades (Cagayan de Oro City, Misamis Oriental)
1994-12-16	7840	Increasing Bed Capacity of a Hospital : Donsol District Hospital (Donsol, Sorsogon)
1994-12-16	7841	Establishing a National High School : Parañaque National High School (Parañaque, NCR)
1994-12-16	7842	Establishing a Hospital : Tagig-Pateros District Hospital (Taguig, NCR)
1994-12-21	7843	Amending the Tariff and Customs Code of the Philippines : Anti-Dumping Act of 1994 (Nationwide)
1994-12-21	7844	Export Development Act of 1994 (Nationwide)
1994-12-30	7845	Appropriations Act of 1995 (Nationwide)
1994-12-30	7846	Amending PD 996 : Compulsory Immunization Against Hepatitis-B (Nationwide)
1994-12-30	7847	Radio and Television Broadcasting Franchise : Philippine Radio Educational and Information Center (Nationwide)
1994-12-30	7848	Establishing a National High School : Guimba National High School (Guimba, Nueva Ecija)
1994-12-30	7849	Converting a School into a college : Buguias-Loo Polytechnic College (Buguias, Benguet)
1994-12-24	7850	Establishing a Hospital : Conner District Hospital (Conner, Kalinga-Apayao)
1994-12-24	7851	Declaring Every September 24 a Special Nonworking Holiday in Calamba Municipality in Commemoration of the Birth of Jose Yulo Sr. (Calamba, Laguna)
1994-12-24	7852	Declaring a Tourism Spot : Chocolate Hills (Carmen, Bohol)
1994-12-24	7853	Converting a School into a college : Apayao Institute of Science and Technology (Conner and Luna in Kalinga-Apayao)

=== 1993 (7645–7666) ===
Date approved	RA number	Title/category
1993-01-06	7645	Appropriations Act of 1993 (Nationwide)
1993-02-24	7646	Amending the National Internal Revenue Code of 1977 : Provisions Regarding Large Taxpayers (Nationwide)
1993-03-05	7647	Providing for the Date of the Regular Elections of Elective Officials of the Government of the Autonomous Region in Muslim Mindanao (Autonomous Region in Muslim Mindanao)
1993-04-05	7648	Electric Power Crisis Act of 1993 (Nationwide)
1993-04-06	7649	Amending the National Internal Revenue Code of 1977 : Requiring Governmental Entities to Deduct and Withhold VAT Due from its Purchases of Goods and Services (Nationwide)
1993-04-06	7650	Amending the Tariff and Customs Code of the Philippines : On the Physical Examination of Imported Articles (Nationwide)
1993-06-04	7651	Amending the Tariff and Customs Code of the Philippines : Revitalizing and Strengthening the Bureau of Customs (Nationwide)
1993-06-04	7652	Investors' Lease Act (Nationwide)
1993-06-14	7653	The New Central Bank Act : Repealing RA 265 and PD 1792 (Nationwide)
1993-06-14	7654	Amending the National Internal Revenue Code of 1977 : Revising the Excise Tax Base on Cigars and Cigarettes and Allocating Portions of the Revenue for Specific Purposes (Nationwide)
1993-08-19	7655	Amending PD 442 or the Labor Code of the Philippines : Increasing the Minimum Wage of Househelpers (Nationwide)
1993-11-09	7656	Requiring Government-Owned or -Controlled Corporations to Declare Dividends under Certain Conditions to the National Government (Nationwide)
1993-11-09	7657	Amending RA 7637 or the Mount Pinatubo Assistance, Resettlement, and Development Fund : Provisions on the Appropriation Clause, on the commission, and on the Implementation (Nationwide)
1993-11-09	7658	Amending RA 7610 or the Special Protection of Children Against Child Abuse, Exploitation, and Discrimination Act : Provisions on the Employment of Children (Nationwide)
1993-12-13	7659	Amending the Revised Penal Code : Imposing the Death Penalty on Certain Heinous Crimes (Nationwide)
1993-12-23	7660	Amending the National Internal Revenue Code of 1977 : Rationalizing the Structure and Administration of the Documentary Stamp Tax (Nationwide)
1993-12-23	7661	Amending RA 7181 : Further Extending the Life of the Committee on Privatization and the Asset Privatization Trust and Other Provisions (Nationwide)
1993-12-23	7662	Legal Education Reform Act of 1993 (Nationwide)
1993-12-30	7663	Appropriations Act of 1994 (Nationwide)
1993-12-30	7664	Establishing a State College : Aurora State College of Technology (Baler, Casiguran, and Maria Aurora in Aurora)
1993-12-30	7665	Converting a college into a State University : Bulacan State University (Bulacan)
1993-12-30	7666	Integrating Colleges into a State College : Sorsogon State College (Sorsogon, Magallanes, Castilla, and Bulan in Sorsogon)

=== 1992 (7160–7644) ===
Date approved	RA number	Title/category
1992-01-01	7160	Creating a Province: Guimaras
1992-03-26	7306	Radio and Television Broadcasting Franchise: People's Television Network (Nationwide)
1992-06-17	7610	Special Protection of Children Against Abuse, Exploitation and Discrimation Act

=== 1967 (4865–5190) ===
Date Approved	RA number	Title / Category
1967-04-26	4865	Renaming of a portion of the Pan-Philippine Highway
1967-05-08	4866	Declaration of Basista, Pangasinan as a Duly-Constituted Municipality
1967-05-08	4867	Creation of the Provinces of Davao del Norte, Davao del Sur, and Davao Oriental
1967-06-17	5017	Establishing a School of Arts and Trades: Ozamiz City School of Arts and Trades

== See also ==
- Congress of the Philippines (section on Lawmaking)
- Decree - this type of law has been used to create many institutions, such as the Philippine Heart Center, which is not used in many other countries.
- Philippine energy law
- Philippines
