= List of San Beda University alumni =

The following is a list of people who have studied at the San Beda University by campus.

== San Beda University Manila ==
=== Presidents, vice presidents and historical figures ===
- Agapito "Butz" Aquino (GS, HS) - key personality during the 1986 EDSA People Power Revolution; former Philippine senator and House Minority Floor Leader
- Benigno Aquino Jr. (HS) - former Senator and key personality of the anti-Marcos regime struggle
- Rodrigo Duterte (LI.B) - 16th President of the Republic of the Philippines; former Mayor of Davao City
- Ramon V. Mitra (HS, Ll.B ) - 1992 Philippine presidential candidate; former Speaker of the House of Representatives; former senator and agriculture minister; human rights lawyer
- Leni Robredo (Ll.M.) - 14th Vice President of the Republic of the Philippines
- Raul Roco (AB, Ll.B) - 2004 Philippine presidential candidate; former senator and education secretary; champion of women's rights and icon of the youth
- Rene Saguisag (AB, Ll.B) - former Philippine Senator; Human Rights advocate; co-founder of the Movement of Attorneys for Brotherhood, Integrity, and Nationalism, Inc. (MABINI)
- Sara Duterte (transferred) - 15th vice president of the Republic of the Philippines; former mayor of Davao City

=== Senators and representatives ===
- Tomas V. Apacible (CAS) - Representative, 1st District, Batangas
- Leila de Lima (Ll.B) - Senator; former Secretary of Justice; former Chairperson, Commission on Human Rights; prominent election lawyer of Pampanga Gov. Eddie Panlilio and Isabela Gov. Grace Padaca

=== Judiciary and legal services ===
- Roberto R. Concepcion, Sr. (GS, HS, AA) - Chief Justice of the Supreme Court of the Philippines (1966–1973); Commissioner, 1986 Philippine Constitutional Commission
- Mariano C. del Castillo (AB) - Associate Justice of the Supreme Court of the Philippines
- Antonio M. Martinez (Ll.B) - former Associate Justice of the Supreme Court of the Philippines
- Jose Catral Mendoza (Ll.B), Associate Justice of the Supreme Court of the Philippines
- Antonio Eduardo B. Nachura (Ll.B) - Associate Justice of the Supreme Court of the Philippines; former solicitor-general; former member of the House of Representatives; former faculty, San Beda College of Law; former dean, Arellano Law School
- Florenz D. Regalado (Ll.B) - retired Justice of the Philippine Supreme Court; holder of the highest bar exam rating for a bar examinee
- Bienvenido L. Reyes (Ll.B) - Associate Justice of the Supreme Court of the Philippines

=== Local and provincial officials ===
- Calixto R. Catáquiz (HS, BS) - mayor, San Pedro, Laguna; former General Manager of Laguna Lake Development Authority
- George A. Elias (GS, HS) - vice mayor, Taguig
- Mike Rama (Ll.B) - mayor of Cebu City
- Edu Pamintuan (BS) - councilor of Angeles City

=== Appointed government officials ===
- Antonio C. Delgado - former Philippine Ambassador to the Vatican; Delivery Services and Hotel Pioneer
- Dennis Funa (HS, LLB) - Chairman, Insurance Commission
- Emilio Aquino (Ll.B) - Chairperson, Securities and Exchange Commission (Philippines)

=== Private law practice ===
- Tranquil Salvador III (HS) - partner and co-head, Litigation and Arbitration Department, Romulo, Mabanta, Buenaventura, Sayoc, and de los Angeles (ROMULO)
- Manolito A. Manalo (HS) - Managing Partner, Ocampo Manalo Valdez & Lim (OMLAW)

=== Business and economics ===
- Manuel V. Pangilinan (GS, HS, Doctor of Humanities, honoris causa) - chairman, Philippine Long Distance Company; chief executive officer of Metro Pacific Corporation; chairman of the Board of Trustees of San Beda College-Mendiola, Manila

=== Media and entertainment ===
- Harlon Agsaoay - founding member and lead vocals of Tanya Markova, singer and composer
- Hajji Alejandro (GS, HS) - original member of The Circus Band in the early 70s, multi-awarded singer
- Jimmy Antiporda (GS, HS) - composer, music arranger and record producer
- Herbert Bautista - Quezon City mayor, actor
- Dingdong Dantes (AB) - actor and director
- Eddie Garcia (AB) – actor and filmmaker
- Rachelle Ann Go - singer
- Eddie Gutierrez (GS, HS) - Filipino movie actor
- Danny Javier (GS, HS) - member of popular and multi-awarded APO Hiking Society, singer, composer, actor and TV host
- Jade Lopez - actress
- Francis Magalona - rapper, actor, and businessman
- Kristofer Martin-actor, singer
- Derrick Monasterio (CAS) - actor
- Aga Muhlach (BSC) - actor
- Niño Muhlach (BSC) - actor
- Kip Oebanda (CAS) - director
- Jett Pangan (GS, HS) - lead singer and founding member of The Dawn
- Fernando Poe, Jr. (GS) - Filipino actor, "Da King" of Philippine movies, national artist and former 2004 Philippine presidential candidate
- Jolo Revilla - actor

=== Medicine and health sciences ===
- Dr. Teodoro Herbosa (GS, HS) - Executive Vice President, University of the Philippines, Consultant NTF IATF COVID-19, UP-PGH Head Emergency Medicine

=== Sports ===
- Edmundo "Ato" Badolato - Red Cubs legend coach; former commissioner of UAAP
- Enrico "Koy" Banal - former head coach of the 2006 San Beda Red Lions champion team
- Loreto Carbonell - 1952 Olympian
- Roland Dantes - champion bodybuilder, martial artist and actor
- Mat Ranillo III - former college basketball player of NCAA, and actor
- Frankie Lim - former PBA player, former Red Lions Head Coach
- Carlos Loyzaga - former Philippine Olympian known as the "Big Difference" to the Philippine sports press (1952, 1956 Olympian)
- Joaquin "Chito" Loyzaga - Philippine basketball player and son of Carlos Loyzaga
- Arturo Macapagal - former member of Philippine Olympic target shooting team
- Ronald Magsanoc - Philippine basketball player
- Venancio "Benjie" Paras - Philippine basketball player; actor, HS '86
- Ren-Ren Ritualo - Philippine basketball player
- LA Tenorio - Philippine basketball player
- Emmanuel Boybits Victoria - former PBA player
- Ferdinand "Dindo" Pumaren - former PBA player, former Red Cubs

=== Honorary alumni ===
- Corazon C. Aquino (Doctor of Humanities, honoris causa) - wife of Bedan senator Benigno Aquino Jr. and former president of the Philippines
- Diosdado P. Macapagal - former president of the Philippines (1961–1965); lecturer and professor, San Beda College of Law
- Artemio Panganiban - 21st Supreme Court Chief Justice of the Philippines; honorary alumnus, San Beda College of Law
- Fidel V. Ramos - former president of the Philippines; Honorary Alumnus, San Beda College of Law
- Arturo Tolentino - former Philippine senator; professor, San Beda College of Law

== San Beda College Alabang ==
- Ryan Agoncillo (GS, HS) - TV celebrity, host and actor
- Rico Blanco (GS, HS) - former vocalist of Rivermaya
- Lino Cayetano (GS, HS) - former Taguig City Mayor, television director and brother of Senator Pia S. Cayetano
- Enrique Gil (CAS) - actor, dancer, matinee idol, host
- Marlo Mortel (CAS) - model, singer, and actor
- A.G. Syjuco (CAS) - international award-winning producer and composer
