= A.G. Syjuco =

Music producer, composer, and musician

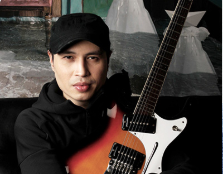
- Music producer, composer and musician A.G. Syjuco

Background information
- Also known as: Black Leather Birds
- Born: Augusto Cesare Amado R. Syjuco; August 1980 (age 46); Manila, Philippines
- Genre: Art-rock
- Occupations: Music producer, composer, and musician
- Instrument: Guitar

A.G. Syjuco (born Augusto Cesare Amado R. Syjuco in August 1980), also known as Black Leather Birds, is a music producer, composer, and musician originally from Manila, Philippines. He is the eldest son of avant-garde artists Cesare Syjuco and Jean Marie Syjuco and is the producer, principal composer, and primary instrumentalist of the experimental rock band Jack of None.

He was the lead guitarist and composer for the art-rock band FAUST! at age 15. The band was discovered by MTV Asia in 1996 and quickly signed to a major label. FAUST! released two albums that included My Secret Identity (MSI) in 1998 — which was arguably the first full-length album in the Philippines to be released for free on the Internet by a group of commercially signed recording artists - and disbanded shortly after. A.G. took a hiatus from the music industry for eight years, and during this period he graduated valedictorian (Summa Cum Laude) with a bachelor's degree in information technology from San Beda College Alabang.

In 2006, A.G. co-produced the album "A Sudden Rush of Genius", by his father, Cesare Syjuco. From 2005 to 2010 A.G. was the lead guitarist and composer of the band “Utakan” which he formed with his wife Mica and sister Maxine Syjuco. In 2016, the band re-formed as Jack of None with A.G., Maxine and their brother Julian as the third member. Currently A.G. is the producer, principal composer and primary instrumentalist (on guitars, synthesizer and bass) for Jack of None.

In March 2018, A.G. was awarded the Independent Music Award in New York City, U.S.A., for Best Music Producer in the eclectic category for his work on Jack of None's second album "Who Shot Bukowski?" Jack of None's EP, "The Tattle Tale Heart" (which AG produced) also won Best EP - Eclectic at that year's IMAs.

The following year, A.G. as a previous winner was invited to be a judge at the 17th Annual Independent Music Awards.

A.G. and Jack of None represented the Philippines in the 9th International Video Poetry Festival in Greece in early 2021.

A.G. released his first solo EP “The Color of Memory” under the name “Black Leather Birds” on March 13, 2021. Two music videos produced for this album received recognition and honors from international music video festivals and award-giving bodies.

A.G.’s music video for “Our Angry Science” under his Black Leather Birds project won Best Experimental Music Video at the Munich Music Video Awards in May 2021. It also won Best Experimental Music Video at the International Sound Future Awards 2021 (NYC), Honorable Mention for Best Art Music Video at the International Music Video Awards 2021, and was a Finalist for Best Animated Music Video at the Paris Music Video Underground Festival 2021. The music video for "One More for the Road", a track also from the EP "The Color of Memory", was included as an official selection for the Austin Music Video Festival 2021, and received the Honorable Mention for Best Art Music Video at the International Sound Future Awards 2021 (NYC).

In 2022, A.G. produced the single "Dios Por Santo" for Jack of None. The music video for the track won Best Experimental Music Video at the Music Video Underground Festival 2022 (Paris, France) and Best Rock Music Video at the Ninja Indies Music Awards 2022 (Tokyo, Japan).

Between 2023 and 2025, Syjuco continued releasing solo material under the Black Leather Birds name, including the singles "Right as Rain", "Abstraction", "My Name is X", "Clever" and "Unknown". In May 2026, Syjuco released of Children and Their Sorceries, his second EP under the Black Leather Birds name. In June 2026, Syjuco was interviewed by ROMBO Magazine about the EP and the Black Leather Birds project, discussing solitude, domestic space, family life and the shift from primarily instrumental work toward writing in his own voice.

== Awards and nominations ==
Year	Organization	Award	Nominated work	Result
2016	Independent Music Awards	Independent Music Award for Best Spoken Word Album	Who's Listening To Van Gogh's Ear?	Nominated
2016	Independent Music Awards	Independent Music Award for Best Spoken Word Song	Mrs. Stitcher	Nominated
2018	Independent Music Awards	Independent Music Award for Best Music Producer - Eclectic	Who Shot Bukowski?	Won
2018	Independent Music Awards	Independent Music Award for Best EP - Eclectic	The Tattle Tale Heart	Won
2018	Independent Music Awards	Independent Music Award for Best Spoken Word Album	Who Shot Bukowski?	Nominated
2018	Independent Music Awards	Independent Music Award for Best Eclectic Song	Polyamorous Serial Monogamist	Nominated
2018	Independent Music Awards	Independent Music Award for Best Spoken Word Song	Dear Georges (Vous Petit Monstre)	Nominated
2018	Independent Music Awards	Independent Music Award for Best Eclectic Album	Who Shot Bukowski?	Nominated
2018	Independent Music Awards	Independent Music Award for Best Lyric Music Video	The Brainwashers	Nominated
2019	Independent Music Awards	Independent Music Award for Best Eclectic Song	Michigan Ex Machina (She Wasn't Me)	Nominated
2019	Independent Music Awards	Independent Music Award for Best Spoken Word Song	Michigan Ex Machina (She Wasn't Me)	Nominated
2021	Munich Music Video Awards	Best Experimental Music Video	Our Angry Science	Won
2021	International Sound Future Awards (NYC)	Best Experimental Music Video	Our Angry Science	Won
2021	International Music Video Awards	Best Art Music Video - Honorable Mention	Our Angry Science	Won
2021	Paris Music Video Underground Festival	Best Animated Music Video	Our Angry Science	Shortlisted
2021	Austin Music Video Festival	Official Selection	One More for the Road	Shortlisted
2021	International Sound Future Awards (NYC)	Best Art Music Video - Honorable Mention	One More for the Road	Won
2021	9th International Video Poetry Festival (Greece)	Official Selection	Maman (under Jack of None)	Won
2022	Paris Music Video Underground Festival	Best Experimental Music Video	Dios Por Santo (under Jack of None)	Won
2022	Ninja Indies Music Awards	Best Rock Music Video	Dios Por Santo (under Jack of None)	Won
