= Maxine Syjuco =

Filipina artist

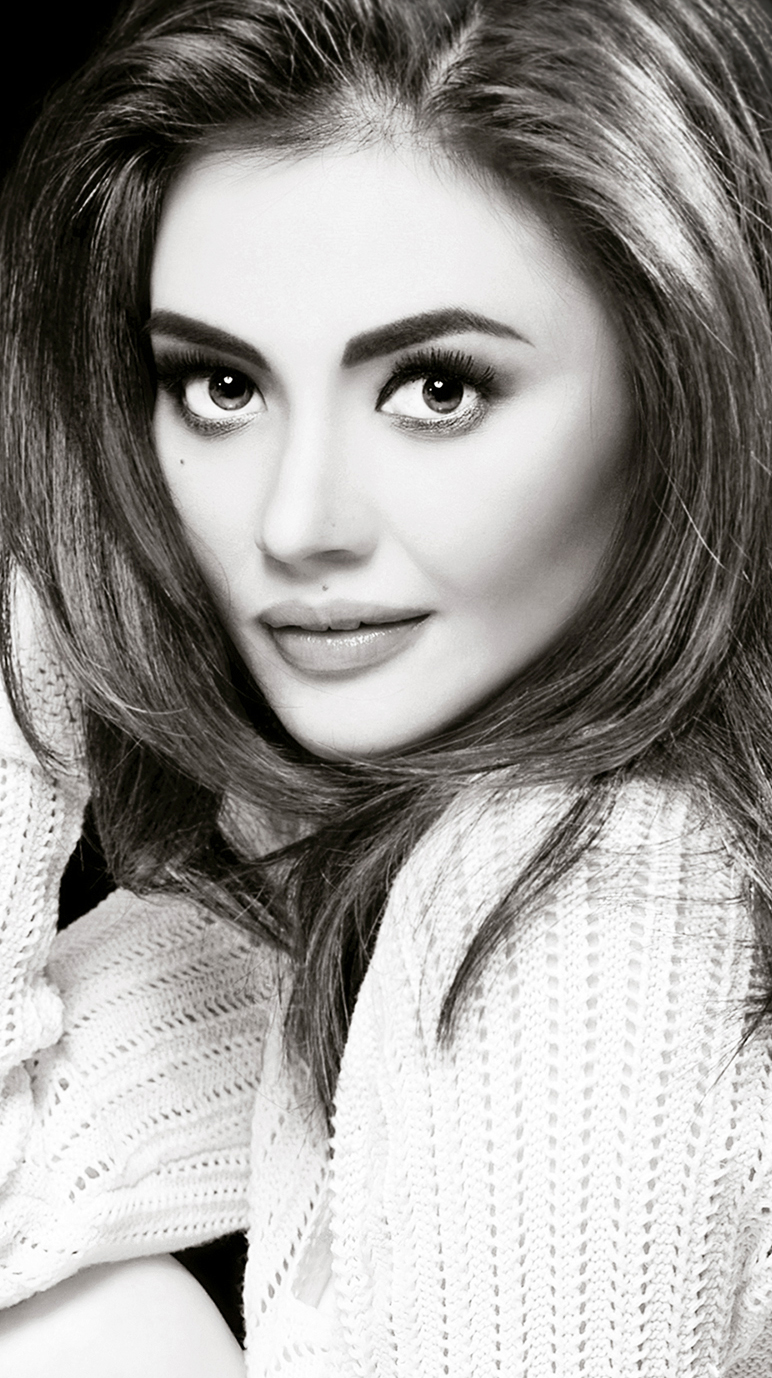
Artist, poet and model Maxine Syjuco

Maxine Syjuco (born December 1, 1984) is an artist, poet and model from Manila, Philippines. She is the youngest daughter of avant-garde artists Cesare Syjuco and Jean Marie Syjuco, and is the vocalist and songwriter of the experimental Art Rock band Jack of None.

She works mainly with photography, digital collage, painting and installation art, engaging with themes that include love, loss, longing, and temporality, as well as femininity, emotion, and memory.

Her first book of poetry, "A Secret Life," was published in 2008 and received critical acclaim. Her poems have been translated into Polish and French, and have seen print in several international anthologies including the Asia Literary Review, The Poet’s Guild Quarterly, Chopin with Cherries, and the 2011 Rhino International Poetry Anthology.

In 2016, she was awarded the Independent Music Award in New York City, U.S.A., for Best Album Art, Photography and Design. In the same competition, her band, Jack of None, received 2 category nominations (Best Spoken Word Song, and Best Album of the Year) for their debut album titled "Who's Listening to Van Gogh's Ear?".

Syjuco's exhibits and poetry-performances have taken place in venues as varied as the Cultural Center of the Philippines, the Metropolitan Museum of Manila, the Tokiwa Museum of Japan, the Hangaram Museum of Korea, the Art Takes Miami Exhibition in the U.S.A., and others.
