= Ezinwa Okoroafor =

Nigerian legal practitioner

Ezinwa Nwanyieze Okoroafor is a Nigerian legal practitioner. She served as the International Secretary of the International Federation of Women Lawyers, (FIDA) in 2017. She has previously served as Regional Vice President for Africa for International Federation of Women Lawyers, (FIDA), and National President for the Nigeria branch of the International Federation of Women Lawyers, (FIDA).

Okoroafor was the council member of Nigerian Bar Association women forum, national chairperson of the Society of Women in Taxation of Nigeria, delegate to the Nigeria National Conference of 2014
