= Women and government in the Philippines =

Women and government in the Philippines describes the trend on how women in the Philippines participate in the politics and governance of the Republic of the Philippines throughout its history. There had been a gradual increase in the number of Filipino women participating in Philippine politics, both at the local and national level. Female involvement in the political environment of the Philippines was highlighted by the election of two women as President of the Philippines, namely Corazon Aquino and Gloria Macapagal Arroyo.

== Legal basis ==
Representation and integration of Filipino women in Philippine politics at the local and national levels had been made possible by legislative measures such as the following: the Local Government Code of 1991, the Party List Law, the Labor Code of 1989, the Women in Nation Building Law (Philippine Republic Act No. 7192 of 1991), the Gender and Development Budget (GAD), the 1988 Comprehensive Agrarian Reform Law, the Philippine Republic Act No. 7688 of 1994, the 1990 Day Care Law (Republic Act No. 6972), the 1996 Paternity Leave Act, the Anti-Sexual Harassment Law (Republic Act No. 7877 of 1995), the Philippine Republic Act No. 7822 of 1995, the Philippine Republic Act No. 8353 of 1997, the Philippine Plan for Gender Responsive Development (1995-2025), and the Philippine Plan for Women which includes the Framework Plan for Women (FPW).

== Composition ==
The following percentage figures demonstrate the number of female participants from 1991 to 2001 in Philippine politics and government:

=== Voters, elected candidates, and appointments ===
There had been 76.7% of female registered voters in the 2001 elections. In 1999, the percentage of Filipino women in public service are 34.6% at the first level, 71.9% at the second level, 34.8% at the third level, and 18.2% at the cabinet level (as heads of governmental departments). In 2001, there had been 7.7% of Filipino women in the Philippine Senate, 19.0% in the Philippine Congress, 19.5% serving as governors, 13.0% as vice-governors, 16.5% as board members, 15.6% as mayors, 12.4% as vice-mayors, 17.4% as councilors. In Philippine courts, there were 21.4% Filipino women judges in 2001.

The preceding figures translates that 90,714 positions (out of 354,387) had been occupied by Filipino women. Directly quoting Mylene Hega's report titled Participation of Women in Philippine Politics and Society: A Situationer written in March 2003, this means that there had been 16 Filipino female governors (out of 79), eight vice governors (out of 79), 97 board members, 16 city mayors (out of 114), nine city vice mayors (out of 114), 182 city councilors, 225 municipal mayors (out of 1,493), 144 municipal vice mayors and 1,731 councilors, 5,350 Punong Barangays or heads of barangays (out of 41,917), 64,142 Sangguniang Barangay leaders, and 18,794 Sangguniang Kabataan chairpersons. Hega further mentioned that, at those times, there were 49,173 Filipino women who were appointed as secretaries and treasures for the barangay. Out of 49,173, female barangay secretaries were at 23,983; while 25,190 were barangay treasurers.

=== Decision-makers and diplomats ===
In terms of decision-making positions and diplomatic posts, there had been 138 female Filipino diplomats, wherein 37 were ambassadors (chiefs of missions), 21 were minister-counsellors, and 80 were foreign service officers. According to a Statement of the Philippine Commission on Women: On International Women's Day on March 11, 2013, Filipino women had been appointed by the Philippine president to "top strategic and non-traditional government posts" including positions such as Chief Justice, as Secretary of Justice, and as Presidential Adviser on the Peace Process.

=== Military and policing ===
In relation to the number of women in the Philippine military and in the Philippine police forces, 7 Filipino women had been among the 147 people who graduated from the Philippine Military Academy in 1995, meaning that 3.1% of the 2,658 police were females.

=== Labor unions ===
In 1993, there were 41.4% registered labor union female members in the private industry sector. From 1994 to 1996, there was about 60% registered labor union female members in the public sector. 20.7% of the registered women members in the public sector were holding positions as labor union presidents.

== Obstacles ==
Among the hindrances in participation of women in Philippine politics identified by Helga in her 2003 report include Philippine society's definition of women's role in the community. This role describes women in the Philippines as persons more appropriate for secondary roles such as being supporters of their politician husbands, become "diplomatic entertainers" for their husband's constituents, being providers of charity work and social welfare functions, their maternal role as caretakers of the next male generation of male politicians, and the access to resources for those who were elected to decision-making positions.

== See also ==
- Women in the Philippines
