= Josefina Phodaca-Ambrosio =

Filipina lawyer (c. 1917 – 1970)

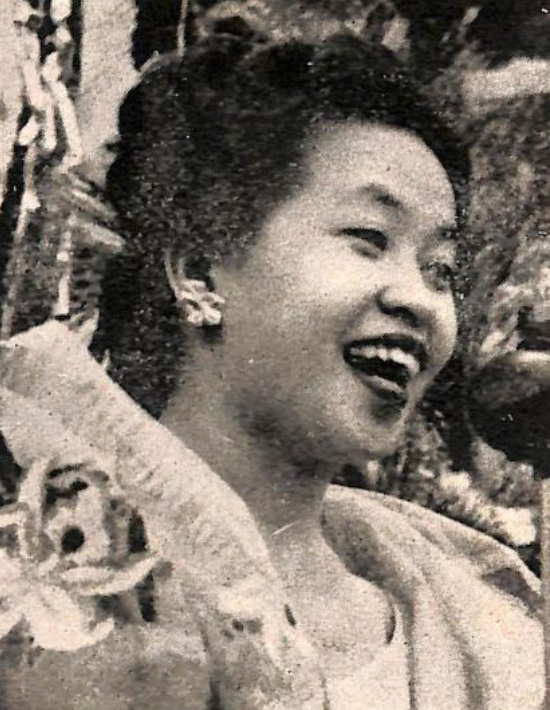
- Josefina Phodaca, from a 1948 publication

Member of the Manila Municipal Board
- In office 1947–1951

Personal details
- Born: Josefina Rodil Phodaca; 1917 Marinduque, Philippine Islands
- Died: September 3, 1970 (aged 52–53)
- Occupation: Lawyer, politician, church leader
- Known for: President of the International Federation of Women Lawyers

Josefina Rodil Phodaca-Ambrosio (about 1917 – 3 September 1970) was a Filipina lawyer, politician and church leader. She sat on the Manila City Council from 1947 to 1951, and was the first Asian president of the International Federation of Women Lawyers (FIDA), serving from 1958 to 1960.

== Early life ==
Josefina Rodil Phodaca was born in Marinduque province, the daughter of Mariano Phodaca and Bonifacia Rodil. Her parents were farmers. She and her sister, Naomi, organized childcare programs and literacy classes in their hometown as young women; both sisters attended law school at the University of Manila. Josefina Phodaca studied urban planning in the United States in 1948, and earned her Master of Laws degree at Yale Law School in 1957.

== Career ==
=== Law and politics in the Philippines ===
Phodaca was admitted to the bar in Manila in 1940, and shared a law practice with her sister and her brother-in-law. She served on the Manila City Council from 1947 to 1951, as chair of health and welfare, and the only woman on the council during her tenure. During her time on the council she campaigned against gambling and prostitution in the city. In 1949, she was already a founder and leader of the short-lived National Political Party of Women in the Philippines, and chair of the Civic Assembly of Women of the Philippines. She was active in the YWCA, Girl Scouting, the National Federation of Women's Clubs, and the women's suffrage and family planning movements in the Philippines. In 1970, she received the Presidential Award of Merit from Ferdinand Marcos.

=== International work ===
Phodaca was elected president of the International Federation of Women Lawyers (FIDA) in 1958, and was an advisor to the Philippines' delegation to the United Nations. In 1959 she was appointed to the UNESCO National Commission of the Philippines.

=== Church work ===
Phodaca was an ordained elder in the Ellinwood Malate Church in Manila. In 1953 she became head of the United Council of Evangelical Church Women. Phodaca attended the United Church Women in America meeting in Ohio in 1955, joined a "fellowship team" on a world tour, and traveled in the United States as a lecturer sponsored by the United Church Women and the Presbyterian Board of Missions. In 1968, Phodaca-Ambrosio attended the Fourth Assembly of the World Council of Churches in Uppsala, where she, Pauli Murray, Rena Karefa-Smart, Annie Jiagge, and others worked to improve women's representation on the council's governing bodies.

== Personal life ==
Phodaca married a widowed lawyer and businessman Dominador Belmonte Ambrosio in 1958. She was widowed when her husband died in 1964. She died in 1970.

She is a grandaunt from Tranquil Salvador III.
