= Lina Sarmiento =

Filipino police officer (born 1958)

Retired Police Director Lina Sarmiento

Deputy Director General of TESDA
- Incumbent
- Assumed office May 8, 2021
- President: Rodrigo Duterte; Bongbong Marcos

Personal details
- Born: Lina Sarmiento; September 23, 1958 (age 67) Philippines
- Police career
- Service: Philippine National Police
- Allegiance: Philippines
- Divisions: PNP Crime Laboratory; Directorate for Operations; PNP Human Rights Affairs Office; Police Security and Protection Group; Eastern Police District; Community Relations Group
- Service years: 1980–2014
- Rank: Police Director

Lina Sarmiento (born 1958) is the first female third-level official of the Philippine National Police to receive and hold the rank of director, a rank equivalent to that of a major general in the Philippine military. At this two-star rank level, Sarmiento became the head of the PNP’s Community Relations Group on June 22, 2012 at the age of 53, a part of the PNP Directorial Staff. Before this post, Sarmiento was a police chief superintendent.

== Biography ==
As a graduate student with a bachelor's degree in Chemistry, Sarmiento started in her career as policewoman as a forensic chemist in the police service, by joining the Philippine National Police in 1980. She later held other positions in the PNP Crime Laboratory, Directorate for Operations, Police Regional Office and the Philippine Drug Enforcement Agency. She later became Director of the PNP Human Rights Affairs Office and the Police Security and Protection Group. Sarmiento was also a graduate student with a degree in Law. Sarmiento was neither a member of both the Philippine Military Academy (PMA) and the Philippine National Police Academy (PNP Academy).

== Personal life ==
Sarmiento is married to her husband Avelino. She has four children, namely Mark Alvin, Matthew Allen, April Madeline, and Aylene Marie.

== See also ==
- Women in the Philippine National Police
- Women in the Philippine military
