= Emilio Aquino =

Filipino government official (born 1964)

Emilio B. Aquino
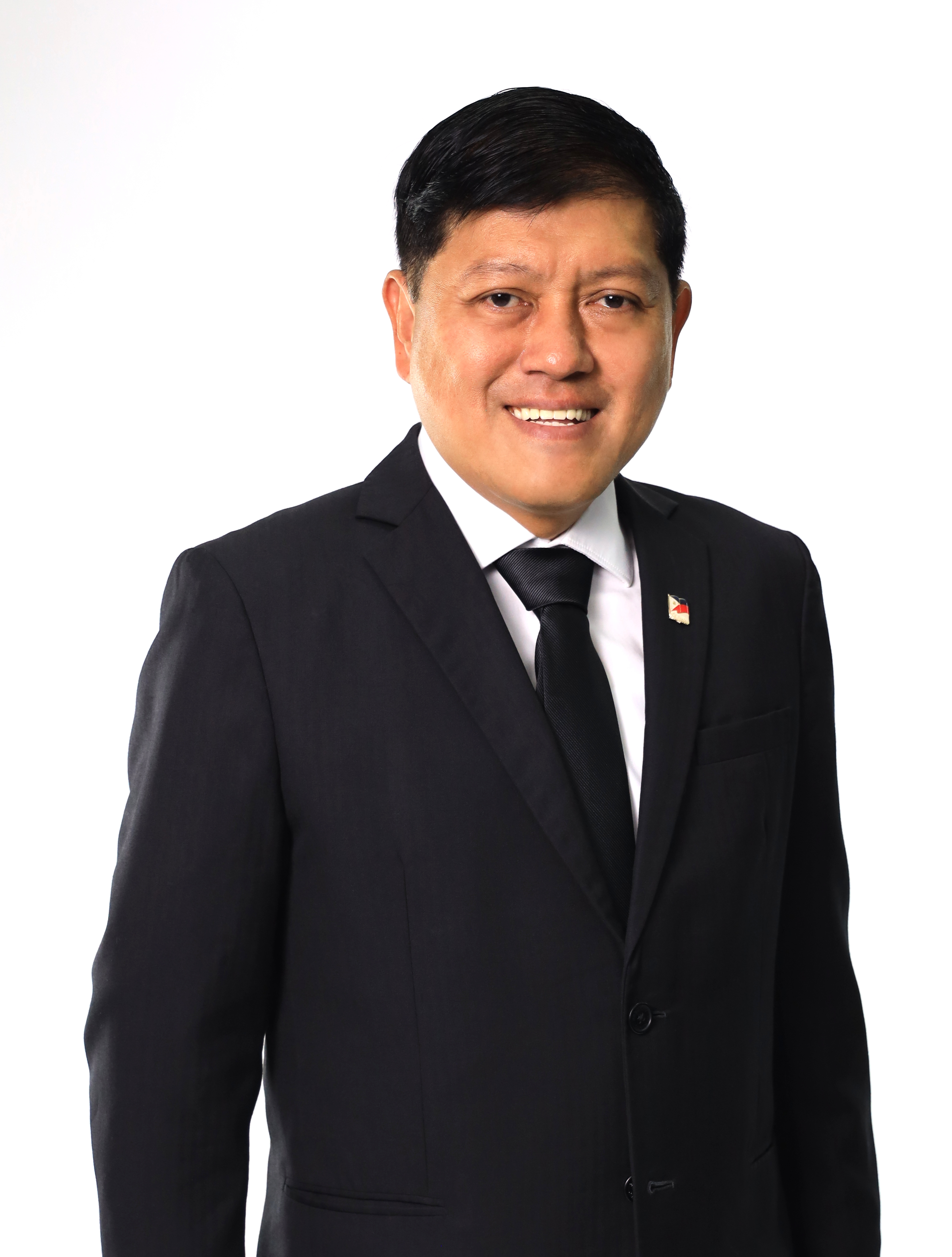

Chairperson of the Securities and Exchange Commission
- Incumbent
- Assumed office June 7, 2018
- President: Rodrigo Duterte
- Preceded by: Teresita Herbosa

Personal details
- Born: Emilio Benito Aquino; July 23, 1964 (age 62) Zamboanga
- Children: 4, including Maria Carmina Aquino
- Education: Universidad de Zamboanga(BS); San Beda University(LL.B)
- Profession: Government official

Emilio Benito Aquino (born July 23, 1964) is the former chairperson and CEO of the Securities and Exchange Commission (Philippines). He took office on June 7, 2018 until June 5, 2025 and was appointed by then President Rodrigo Roa Duterte. Aquino is also the first CPA-Lawyer to be appointed as SEC Chairperson. Prior to assuming this role, he served as SEC Commissioner after his initial appointment on December 2, 2016.

== Early life and education ==
In 1984, Aquino graduated Magna Cum Laude and Valedictorian with a bachelor's degree in Commerce major in accounting at the Universidad de Zamboanga. After taking the CPA Licensure Exams, he scored a rating of 89.14 percent. He finished his law studies at San Beda University where he was a Dean’s Lister and Silver Medalist. He placed 16th in the 1992 Bar Exams.

Aquino earned his master's degree in Public Management at the Development Academy of the Philippines under a government scholarship. He was also the recipient of a Certificate of Study by the University of Sydney for a course on Effective Governance. Aquino likewise attended and completed the Fintech Advanced Program at the PBC School of Finance, Tsinghua University. He undertook the AIM Management Development Program for SEC and recently attended the Cambridge Fintech and Regulatory Innovation Program.

== Career ==
For over a decade, Aquino was a practicing CPA-Lawyer based in Western Mindanao. When he assumed the role of SEC Chairperson, Aquino ushered the passage of the Revised Corporation Code, considered as a landmark piece of legislation, that was signed into law by then President Rodrigo Roa Duterte on February 21, 2019.

During his term as SEC Chairperson, Aquino was the Supervising Commissioner for SEC's Enforcement and Investor Protection Department and the Office of the General Counsel. He organized enforcement drives and ushered in the recent sweep against investment scams and predatory lending practices. He was also the SEC's point person on matters related to financial technology, blockchain, and digital assets.

As Chairperson and CEO of SEC, he placed digital innovation as a vital component of the SEC SuperVision 2028 to ensure the Commission’s success in the fulfilment of its mandate as overseer of the corporate sector, regulator of the capital markets, and champion of the investing public. To this end, the SEC under his leadership crafted its Digital Transformation and Technology Modernization Roadmap.

His leadership has brought international recognitions to the SEC for promoting ease of doing business, good corporate governance and sustainability. Under his leadership, the SEC efforts was key in removing the Philippines in the FATF grey list in 2025. In 2019, 2022, and in 2024 the SEC was recognized in Geneva, Switzerland among the top recipients of the United Nations ISAR Honours for best practices in the area of sustainability and SDG reporting of companies, making the SEC the organization that received the most number of ISAR Honours.

In 2024, the London-based Global Accreditation Organization, Investors-In-People, has also named the SEC as among the world’s best employers following the conferment of its accreditation early that year. In 2023, the Corporate Registers Forum conferred the CRF Innovation Award to the SEC for the digitalization of its company registration system, elevating the SEC Electronic Simplified Processing of Applications for Registration of Companies (eSPARC) as one of the world’s best. Further, SEC maintained its distinction as among the best performing government agencies per the Makati Business Club/MAP survey.

For upholding excellence in public service, he also earned the distinction from the Board of Accountancy, as one of the Top 100 CPAs of the century. The Professional Regulation Commission hailed him as the 2023 Outstanding Professional of the Year in the Field of Accountancy while the Philippine Institute of Certified Public Accountants conferred to him the Honorary Life Member and the Outstanding CPA in Government Award. He received the highest honor in 2024 being named as one of The Outstanding Filipinos (TOFIL) by the Junior Chamber International Senate Philippines and was bestowed upon the 2023 Most Outstanding JCI Senator in the Philippines Award in the Field of Government Service/Public Administration.

The Rotary International District 3850 presented to him the Exemplary Rotarian Award and the Cliff Dochterman Award from the International Fellowship of Scouting Rotarians. He is a Major Donor Level 2 of The Rotary Foundation and was the President of the Rotary Club of Zamboanga City West for RY 2009 to 2010 capping the Most Outstanding President plum plus 14 major District Awards and 6 Rotary International Citations and Distinctions.

Aquino is a Past President of the Integrated Bar of the Philippines Zambasulta Chapter which was recognized under his able leadership as the country’s Best IBP Chapter during the 15th National Convention of Lawyers in Cebu City. He was elected President of the UZ Alumni Association and was thrice awarded as the Most Outstanding Alumnus of Universidad de Zamboanga in the field of Law, Business and Accountancy. He was also awarded as Outstanding Silver Jubilarian of San Beda Law ’92. He was also recognized in 2024 as a Distinguished Bedan in Government Service by his alma mater, San Beda University. He is also, presently, the Senior Vice President of the Boy Scouts of the Philippines National Executive Board and the recipient of all the BSP Tamaraw and Usa Awards.

Under his leadership, the SEC became the first national government agency (NGA) to have received the Philippine Quality Award Level 3 for its Mastery in quality management and performance excellence. Recognized by the Civil Service Commission for excellence in human resource management, the SEC has attained PRIME-HRM Maturity Level 3, making it the first NGA to do so. For spearheading the digital transformation of the SEC leading to the significant improvement of ease of doing business in the Philippines, he was named the first ever Public Sector Innovator in the 2023 Mansmith Innovation Awards, and CEO of the Year in the 2022 IDC Future Enterprise Awards. He was also awarded the Orgullo de Zamboanga Premiar (the Highest Pride of Zamboanga) Award.

Apart from the SEC, Aquino is also the chairperson of the government-controlled Credit Information Corporation (CIC), the Microfinance NGO Regulatory Council, and the ASEAN Capital Market Forum Corporate Governance Working Group. He is likewise a sitting member of the Anti-Money Laundering Council (AMLC).
