= Lim Beng Hong =

Malaysian lawyer (1898–1979)

Lim Beng Hong (1898 — 3 February 1979) OBE, more commonly known as Mrs. B. H. Oon, was the first woman to be called to the Malayan Bar, in 1927. She was also the first ethnically Chinese woman to hold a degree from University College London, the first Malayan woman to be called to the English Bar (1926), and the first woman representative on the Federation of Malaya Legislative Council (1948). According to press reports at the time, Lim Beng Hong and her brother Lim Khye Seng were the first brother and sister to be called to the English bar on the same night. They were also both called to the bar in Penang on the same day, which also meant that they made history as the first siblings to be admitted in the Straits Settlements.

== Early life and education ==
Oon was born in Butterworth, Penang in 1898 during British Malaya. She reportedly came from a wealthy family as her father was a merchant. After finishing her education at the Government's Girls' School in Penang, she returned to the school and taught there for 3 years. After that, she decided to go to England with her brother to obtain a law degree.

After receiving her law degree from University College London, Oon and her brother applied to the Bar and they both got admitted to the Inner Temple. The two siblings were then called to the English Bar on the very same night in June 1926.

== Admission to the Malayan Bar ==
She returned to Penang in 1927 to get married. However, marriage did not stop her from applying to join the Bar of the Straits Settlements and the Federated Malay States. At that time in British Malaya, women were prohibited from joining the Bar, so the law was changed in 1927 following a legal challenge led by Oon, which led to her being admitted. Hence, she became the first woman to be admitted to the Malayan Bar. However, the legality of this amendment was not confirmed until 1935 by the Chief Justice of the Kuala Lumpur Supreme Court.

== Notable work and achievements ==
=== Smuggling letters during the war ===
After returning to Penang from England in 1927, she joined the law firm Lim & Lim Advocates and Solicitors. When the war broke out in 1938 and the Japanese invaded Malaya, Oon fled and went to live in Singapore. However, Singapore soon fell into Japanese occupation as well, but since the Asian population was allowed freedom, Oon decided to utilize that freedom and smuggle and deliver letters to prisoners of war that were held captive in Changi Prison.

=== First woman lawmaker of Malaya ===
After the war, Oon became the first woman in Parliament in Malaya. She was appointed as one of the two women representatives of the Federal Legislative Council and she remained part of the council from 1948 to 1955.

=== Politics ===
After 1955, Oon got involved with politics. She joined the Labour Party in her hometown as a councillor. She was also the creator of the "Woman's Charter" which was included in the Pan-Malayan Labour Party manifesto.

=== OBE Award ===
In 1953, Oon received the Most Excellent Order of the British Empire Award in recognition of contributions for the betterment of society in British Malaya.

=== President of the International Federation of Women Lawyers (FIDA) ===
Oon was elected as the President of the International Federation of Women Lawyers in 1971.

== See also ==
- First women lawyers around the world
