= Mary Wilburn =

American lawyer (Feb. 18 1932– Mar. 16 2021)

Mary Nelson Wilburn
- Mary Nelson, later Wilburn, from the 1952 Howard University yearbook
- Born: February 18, 1932; Baltimore MD
- Died: March 16, 2021 (aged 89); Washington, D.C.
- Occupation(s): Lawyer, state official
- Known for: President of FIDA

Mary E. Nelson Wilburn (1932 – March 16, 2021) was an American lawyer and government official. She also taught German at Howard University, was chair of the Wisconsin Parole Board from 1986 to 1987, and was president of the International Federation of Women Lawyers from 2000 to 2002.

== Early life and education ==
Mary E. Nelson was from Washington, D.C.; she was a childhood friend of television producer Ellis Haizlip. She graduated from Howard University in 1952, where she was president of the Howard Players and a member of Alpha Kappa Alpha. At Howard she acted in plays with fellow students Toni Morrison and Roxie Roker. She earned a master's degree in German at the University of Wisconsin in 1955. In 1975, earned a JD at the University of Wisconsin Law School.

Her sister Elizabeth Nelson Ausbrooks, who also graduated from Howard University in 1952, became a political science professor at the University of the District of Columbia.

== Career ==
Nelson appeared in Mamba's Daughters with Roxie Roker, while on tour in Scandinavia and Germany with the Howard Players. She taught German at Howard University from 1962 to 1964. She lived in Nigeria, Venezuela, France, and Guyana with her husband, a UNESCO official, in the 1960s.

Wilburn moved to Wisconsin with her husband in 1973, and served on the school board in Madison, Wisconsin from 1975 to 1977. She was the second Black woman to serve on the Madison school board. She was also a supervising attorney attached to the University of Wisconsin Law School's legal assistance program for institutionalized clients. From 1977 to 1982, she was based in Washington, D.C., working for the Federal Bureau of Prisons. Her 1979 report with Gwynne Sizer, "Family Problems Related to the Female Offender", was part of congressional hearings on women in federal prisons.

Wilburn was the keynote speaker at Madison's NAACP Freedom Fund Banquet in 1980. In 1986, she was appointed head of the Wisconsin Parole Board. "It's a job in which you make decisions about people's lives," she explained, "but not just about the lives of the people whose parole application you're considering. There's the rest of the people who have to receive this person into the community where they live." She resigned in 1987, to move back to Washington.

Wilburn was president of the International Federation of Women Lawyers (FIDA) from 2000 to 2002.

== Personal life ==
Mary Nelson married foreign service officer Adolph Yarbrough Wilburn in 1957. They had two sons, Adolph and Jason. They lived in the "Lunar House" in Madison, a home built in 1969, with materials chosen resembling Moon rocks and space capsule surfaces. She died in March 2021, aged 89 years, in Washington, D.C. Her funeral service was held at St. Augustine Catholic Church, and her gravesite is in Laurel, Maryland.
