= Women in the Philippine military =

Women serve in the Philippine military including in combat roles since 1993.

== Background ==
Women initially served in the Philippine military only in the reserve ranks and the technical services as part of the Women's Auxiliary Corps established in 1963. Women in the WAC to get married. requiring them to serve active duty for five years. This prerequisite was later reduced to three years.

In 1993, women were granted the rights to become trained combat soldiers in the Philippine military when Republic Act No. 7192 was passed, which granted Filipino women to become cadets in the Philippine Military Academy in April 1 of that year. The first women PMA cadets graduated in 1997.

As of 2020, Filipino women are allowed to fulfill combat duties within the Philippine Army. There are 795 officers and 3,777 soldiers in the army who are women. The whole Armed Forces of the Philippines has 2,414 female commissioned officers and 7,843 enlisted personnel.

== Notable Filipino women soldiers ==
The first batch of female cadets to graduate as soldiers in the Philippines was in 1997. Among the notable female cadets was Arlene A. Dela Cruz from the batch of graduates of 1999, who received awards such as the Presidential Saber, the Philippine Navy Award, the Navy Courses Plaque, the Social Sciences Plaque, and the Humanities Plaque. Dela Cruz died in a car crash in 2008.

In 2011, Brigadier General Ramona Go, from San Dionisio, Iloilo, became the first female general in the Philippine Army after being a regular officer. There had been other female generals in the Philippine military, but unlike Go, those female generals were "technical service" crew, serving in the military as nurses.

In peacekeeping in October 2013, Philippine Navy Captain Luzviminda Camacho became the first female officer from the Philippines to lead "the Philippine contingent to a peacekeeping mission of the United Nations. Camacho became the "commander of the 17th Philippine Contingent to Haiti". In addition, Camacho also became the first female "commanding officer of a Navy ship".

Geraldine Roman became the first transgender woman to become a reserve officer in the Philippine military in 2018. She was conferred the rank of lieutenant colonel.

Brigadier General Fatima Claire Navarro became the first female Surgeon General of the AFP in 2021.

== See also ==
- Women in the Philippines
- Women in the military
- Women in the Philippine National Police
- Lina Sarmiento
