= Tranquil Salvador III =

Filipino lawyer and educator

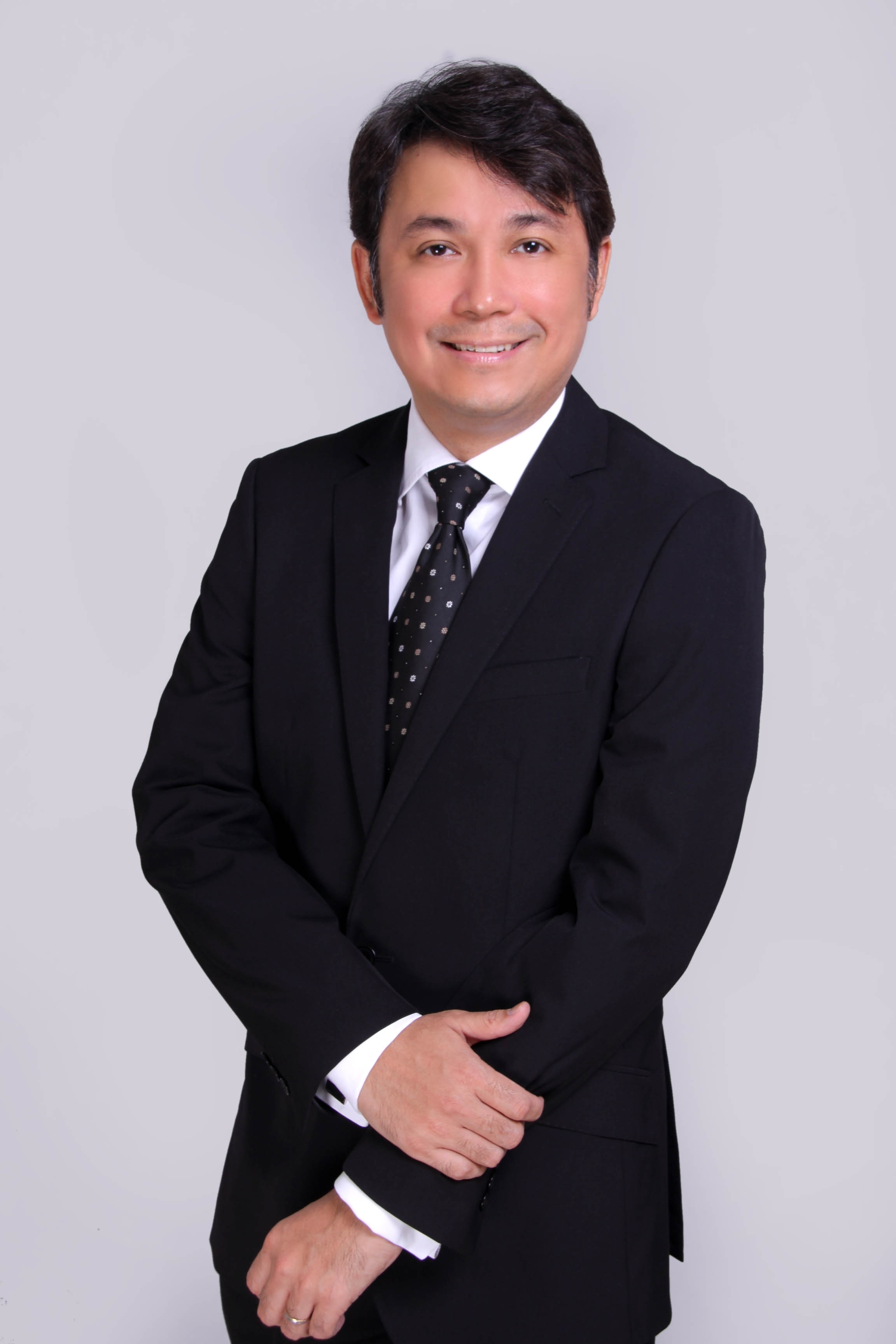
- Born: May 19, 1967 (age 59)
- Education: University of Santo Tomas (AB); Ateneo de Manila University (JD); Suffolk University (LLM)
- Occupations: Lawyer, educator, civil leader

Tranquil Gervacio S. Salvador III (born May 19, 1967) is a Filipino lawyer, educator, and civic leader. He has served as spokesperson and member of the defense panel for the impeachment of the then-Chief Justice Renato Corona and handled other notable cases of Filipino personalities and corporations.

He is a legal analyst for issues of national interest including the removal from office of former Chief Justice Maria Lourdes Sereno and the impeachment complaint filed against the seven justices who voted to remove Sereno through a quo warranto petition. He gave insights on the looming legal questions on the impeachment of Vice President Sara Duterte.

Salvador III is the host for television and radio legal education programs Patakaran of Net 25 and Legally Yours of Radyo Agila. He writes the column "Footnotes" in Manila Standard. He also holds teaching positions in universities and law centers in the Philippines.

He is the Founder of Tranquil Law, a premiere law firm in the Philippines. He was a former Senior Partner in Romulo Mabanta, Buenaventura, Sayoc, and De Los Angeles Law Firm, where he co-headed the Litigation & Arbitration, and Environment and Natural Resources Departments. He is the High Stakes Litigation Vice President of Justinian Lawyers.

He is listed among the Top 100 Lawyers in the Philippines for 2021, 2022, 2023, 2024, and 2025 by the Asia Business Law Journal. He is named by the Asian Legal Business in the Top 15 Litigators in Southeast Asia for 2024.

He is the author of the 2019 book Criminal Procedure (annotated) and Footnotes, a compilation of his legal articles.

== Early life and education ==
Salvador III, born on May 19, 1967, is the eldest of the three children born to Tranquil Phodaca Salvador Jr., a retired Makati regional trial court judge, and Cornelia Suaverdez.

He was awarded second honors in his first two years in San Beda High School and silver medal for Excellence in scientific research in his final year. He was elected as Student Council President of the College of Arts and Letters, University of Santo Tomas, where he earned his degree in economics in 1987. Before his admission to the Philippine Bar in 1992, he served as legal intern in the Commission on Human Rights, Associate Editor of the Ateneo Law Journal, and Student Council President of the Ateneo De Manila University, School of Law (Ateneo), where he received his Juris Doctor in 1991. He also served as the first chairman of the Association of Law Students of the Philippines for National Capital Region in 1990. In recognition, Ateneo awarded him the Evelio B. Javier Leadership Award, an award for students who have consistently pursued the "ideals of genuine leadership, concern for fellow students and selfless service to the law school and the community".

Salvador III obtained his Master of Laws in Suffolk Law School where he specialized in global business law. Visiting International Scholar on Trial Advocacy at Suffolk University Law School in September 2018. Honorary Degree, Doctor of Philosophy in International Humanitarian Law, National Academy of Security and Defense Planning, Romania.

== Academic career ==
Salvador III has been appointed to various teaching and professional positions. He is the Dean of the Manila Adventist College-School of Law and Jurisprudence and the former Dean of the Pamantasan ng Lungsod ng Pasay. He is a professor of law in the University of the Philippines, the Ateneo De Manila University, where he serves as the vice-chairman of the Remedial Law Department, Pamantasan ng Lungsod ng Maynila, and Centro Escolar University School of Law and Jurisprudence. He was a professor of law in Far Eastern University, San Sebastian College and University of the East. He specializes in remedial law, civil and criminal procedure, evidence, trial technique and provisional remedies.

He was the holder of the Justice Jose Colayco Professorial Chair in Remedial Law from 2010 to 2016, and the Tan Yan Kee Professorial Chair from 2006 to 2009, both awarded by Ateneo. He has the ability to simplify, correlate and integrate procedural laws in a manner that students easily understand. Some of them claim to hear his lectures as they answer the bar examinations which they fondly refer to as "Tranquilism".

Salvador III is part of the UP Law Center Committee that deliberated and suggested answers to the Philippine Bar Remedial Law questions in 2007–2010, 2011, 2013, and 2015. In 2011, he became part of the Oversight Committee, led by Justice Roberto Abad, that validated the first multiple choice bar questions. He was the Bar Examiner in Remedial Law in the 2018 and 2023 Bar Exams. The 2018 Bar Examination, with 8,155 examinees, was the last examination to have a single examiner for every subject. He also gives lectures to several bar review centers in the Philippines.

Salvador III is a member of the committee that drafted the Quezon City Litigation Practice, an initiative of the Philippine Supreme Court, with the assistance of the American Bar Association Rule of Law and the United States Agency for International Development. He was appointed by Justice Roberto Abad in the technical working group for Pre-Trial and Trial for the amendment of the Rules of Civil Procedure. He was a member of the 2019 Supreme Court Committee on the Revision of the Rules of Court He is a member of the 2021 Supreme Court Committee on the Code of Professional Responsibility and Accountability, and the 2021 Reorganized Committee on Civil Procedure. He is a member of the Technical Working Group of the Supreme Court drafting the Proposed Rules on Unified Legal Aid Service (ULAS)

== Awards and citations ==
Awardee in Law by the Huwarang Pilipino (Exemplary Filipino) Foundation in 2001 and 2005.

Special Alumni Recognition in Private Law Practice from the Ateneo de Manila Law Alumni Association, Inc.

== Legal career ==
Salvador III was the spokesperson and member of the Defense Team in the Impeachment Case of the late Chief Justice Renato Corona in 2012. Other members of the Defense Team were its lead counsel former Associate Justice Serafin Cuevas, and prominent lawyers Eduardo delos Angeles, Jose Roy III, Jacinto Jimenez, Dennis Manalo, Ramon Esguerra, and Karen Jimeno former Undersecretary of the DPWH.

He gained substantial media attention for sharing his legal opinions that the trial should not be a contest of popularity.

In the impeachment case against de facto Chief Justice Maria Lourdes Sereno, Salvador III was again eyed to assist the House of Representative prosecutors for the possible impeachment proceedings in the Philippine Senate. However, Sereno was ousted through the Quo-Warranto Petition, filed by Solicitor General Jose Calida. Salvador III was one of the legal analysts who concurred that the quo-warranto ouster was constitutional and valid.

Media reporters have consulted with Salvador III on his views regarding the looming constitutional crisis predicated on the Impeachment Complaint filed against the seven Supreme Court Justices who voted against Sereno.

He provided extensive legal analysis on the impeachment articles against Vice President Sara Duterte. This analysis particularly focused on the one-year bar rule, jurisdictional issues, the uniqueness of the process, and the fact that it is both a legal and political exercise.

He has also served as the spokesperson and a lawyer for the PhP. 2 Billion tax assessment case filed against Senator Emmanuel "Manny" Pacquiao.

He was the lead counsel of Deputy Speaker (former Governor of Cebu) Gwendolyn Garcia in the various graft and administrative cases filed against her.

== Civic life ==
Salvador III is the former President of the Integrated Bar of the Philippines - Quezon City Chapter (2009–2011) where he launched the first and only Integrated Bar of the Philippines (IBP) on Wheels Program that brought legal aid assistance by van to local communities. From 2010 to 2011, he served as the District Governor of Rotary International for District 3810, the oldest District in the Philippines consisting the cities of Manila and Pasay and provinces of Cavite and Oriental Mindoro.

He is the Chairman of the Philippine Columbian Association. An association "renowned as a gathering place for those who believe in the principles of liberty and justice" according to President Ramon Magsaysay.

== Personal life ==
Salvador III is married to Maria Roselle Apasan; they have four children. Josefina Phodaca-Ambrosio, the first Asian and only Filipino to become President of Federación Internacional de Abogadas (FIDA), is his paternal grandaunt. Patricia P. Salvador-Daway the first woman President of the Asian Society of Labour Law (AsianSLL) is his aunt.
