= Teresita Herbosa =

Filipino politician and lawyer (born 1950)

Chairwoman of the Securities and Exchange Commission
- In office 29 April 2011 – 15 March 2018
- President: Benigno Aquino III; Rodrigo Duterte
- Preceded by: Manuel Gaite
- Succeeded by: Emilio B. Aquino

Personal details
- Born: October 28, 1950 (age 75) Manila, Philippines
- Party: University of the Philippines; University of Michigan Law School

Teresita Javier Herbosa (born October 28, 1950) was the chairwoman of the Securities and Exchange Commission (Philippines). She was appointed to the SEC by President Benigno Aquino III and took office on April 29, 2011. As chairperson, she is also a member of the Anti-Money Laundering Council (Philippines).

Herbosa has two bachelor's degrees from the University of the Philippines and a Master of Comparative Law degree from the University of Michigan Law School. Prior to her government service she was a co-managing partner of the Angara, Abello, Concepcion, Regala & Cruz Law Offices. She is presently an associate professor at the De La Salle University College of Law, where she teaches courses in Corporation Law and Commercial Law Review.
