= Women in the Philippines =

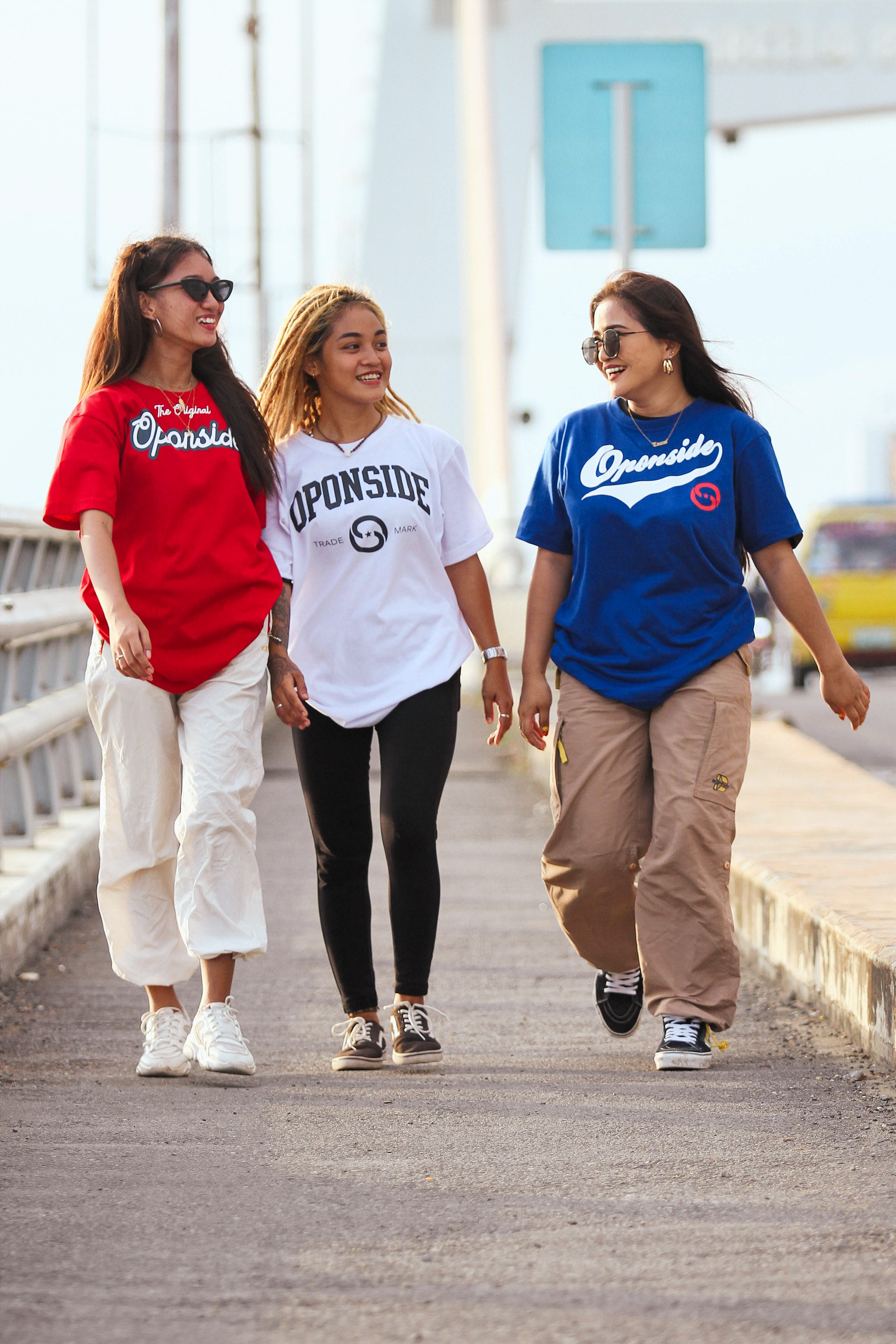
- Group of Filipino women wearing modern apparel

General statistics
- Maternal mortality (per 100,000): 99 (2010)
- Women in parliament: 22.1% (2012)
- Women over 25 with secondary education: 65.9% (2010)
- Women in labour force: 49.7% (2011)

Gender Inequality Index
- Value: 0.419 (2021)
- Rank: 101st out of 191

Global Gender Gap Index
- Value: 0.783 (2022)
- Rank: 17th out of 146

Women in the Philippines (Filipino: Kababaihan sa Pilipinas) may also be known as Filipinas or Filipino women. Their role includes the context of Filipino culture, standards, and mindsets. In certain areas of life, including politics and business, women in the Philippines have achieved a relatively high status, and they also often directly and indirectly run the family unit. There have been two women presidents of the Philippines: Corazon Aquino (1986–1992), and Gloria Macapagal Arroyo (2001–2010).

Compared to other parts of Southeast Asia, women in Philippine society have traditionally enjoyed a greater share of equality.

Filipino society nevertheless remains deeply conservative, being influenced by Roman Catholicism in the Philippines, with the Philippines being the only country in the world other than Vatican City where divorce is prohibited (except for the Muslim minority), and violence against women remains a problem, partly permitted by deficit laws.

== History ==
=== Archaic epoch ===
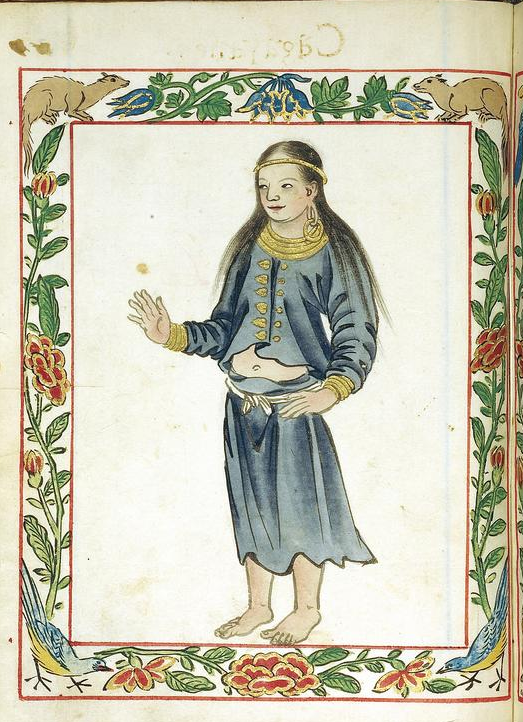
A cagayan woman. Boxer Codex

Some pre-colonial social structures of the Philippines gave equal importance to maternal and paternal lineage. This bilateral kinship system accorded Philippine women enormous power within a clan. They were entitled to property, engage in a trade and could exercise their right to divorce her husband. They could also become village chiefs in the absence of a male heir. Before the arrival of the Spaniards, Filipino women could also achieve status as medicine women or high-priestesses and astrologers.

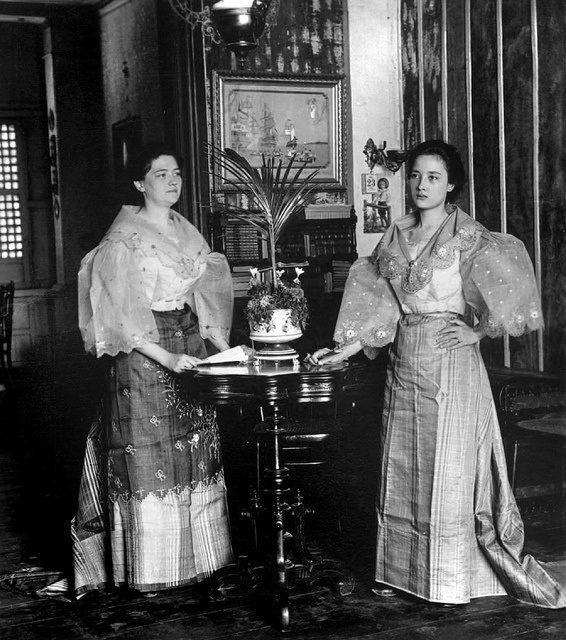
Mestiza Filipina women in Maria Clara gown, 1899.

==== History ====
In the precolonial era of the Philippines there are numerous women are entitled as a Hara and Dayang, the female presence in the Noble caste are prominent in the kinship system in the Philippine societies, here are the examples of notable Queens in the Philippine history:

- Dayang Buka (C.900 CE) Known in the Laguna Copperplate Inscription. She was married to Senapati Jayadewa who was the Rajah of Tondo as a bargain to clear the debt of 1 kati and 8 suwarnas of her parents Namwaran and Dayang Angkatan.
- Hara Udaya or Queen Urduja is a legendary warrior princess who is recognized as a heroine in Pangasinan. The name Urduja appears to be Sanskrit in origin, and a variation of the name "Udaya", meaning "arise" or "rising sun", or the name "Urja", meaning "breath". A historical reference to Urduja can be found in the travel account of Ibn Battuta (1304 – possibly 1368 or 1377 AD), a Muslim traveler from Morocco. Ibn Battuta sailed for 17 days to reach China from the land of Tawalisi.
- Dayang Sima (c. 637 CE) is The legendary queen of South Cotabato known for her sense of justice and respect for the law.
- Empress Sasaban (c.1300s) in oral tradition recounted by Nick Joaquin and Leonardo Vivencio, a "lady of Namayan" who went to the Madjapahit court to marry Emperor Soledan, eventually giving birth to Balagtas, who then returned to Namayan/Pasig in 1300.
- Dayang Kalangitan (r. 1450–ca. 1515) is the only recorded Dayang or queen regnant of the pre-Hispanic Philippine kingdoms of Tondo and Namayan. The eldest daughter of Rajah Gambang and co-regent with her husband, Rajah Lontok, she is considered one of the most powerful rulers in the kingdom's history. She is also notably a Buddhist ruler of the kingdom, which encompassed land along the banks of the Pasig River in Metro Manila.
- Tuanbaloka is woman from Basilan who ascended to power and become the Queen consort of Jolo known for her bravery as she and her husband held of the invaders with 4,000 warriors.

==== Babaylan ====
The babaylan held positions of authority as religious leaders, community doctors and healers in some pre-colonial Philippine societies. The vital functions of the babaylan were highly recognized and embodied in the traditional role of women in a barangay. Cross-dressing males sometimes took on the role of the female babaylan.

The babaylan, also called katalonan, bayoguin, bayok, agi-ngin, asog, bido and binabae depending on the ethnic group of the region, held important positions in the community. They were the spiritual leaders of the Filipino communities, tasked with responsibilities pertaining to rituals, agriculture, science, medicine, literature and other forms of knowledge that the community needed.

In a barangay, the babaylan worked alongside the datu on important social activities. In the absence of a datu, the babaylan could take charge of the whole community.

The role of the babaylan was mostly associated to females, but male babaylans also existed. Early historical accounts record the existence of male babaylans who wore female clothes and took the demeanor of a woman. Anatomy was not the only basis for gender. Gender was based primarily on occupation, appearance, actions and sexuality.

=== Spanish Philippines ===
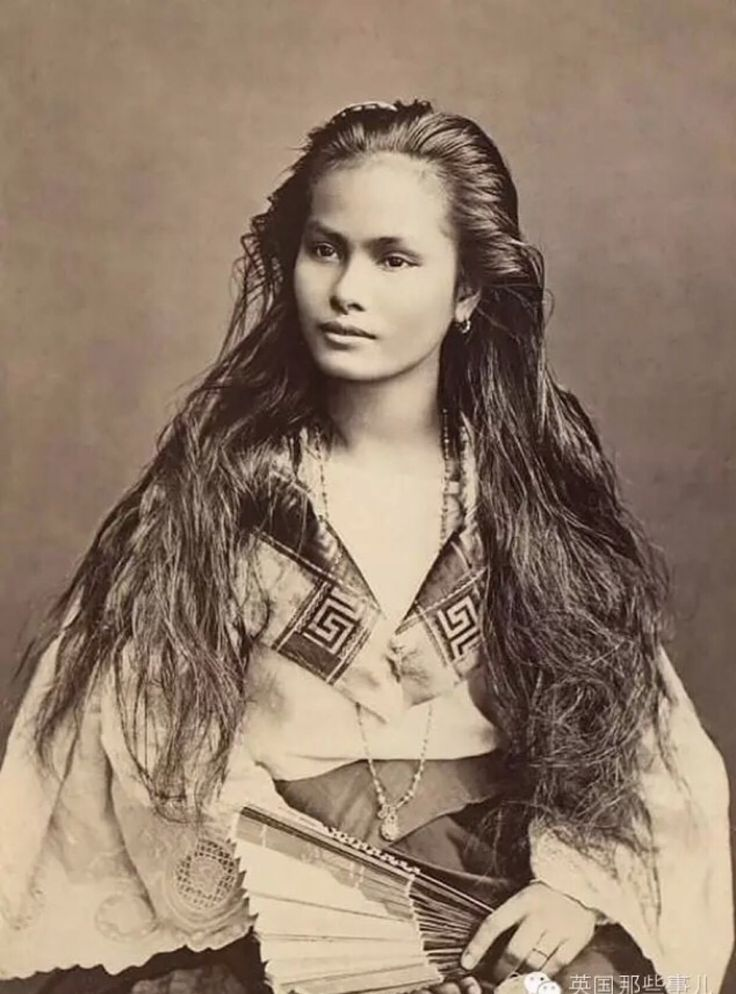
A Filipino mestiza woman in 1875.

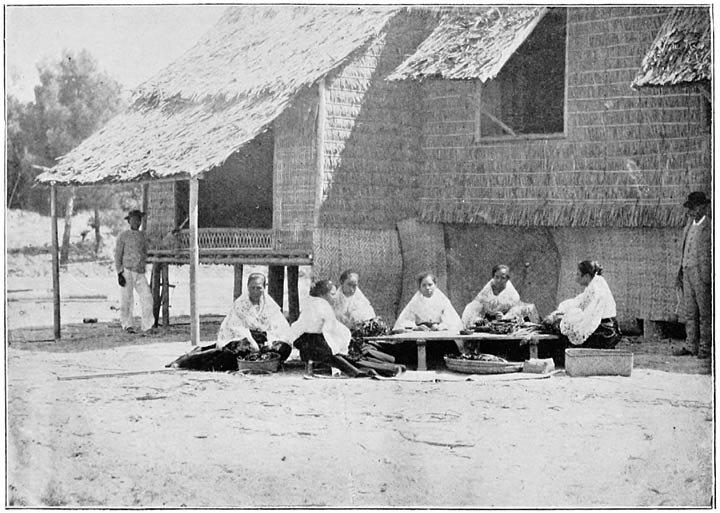
Filipina women making cigars

Although Christian values were supposed to be spread through the population, missionaries and priests soon realized that they'd be better off adapting their doctrine as much as possible to the local customs, rather than trying to impose it. Although the concept of gender equality existed in the Philippines during the pre-Hispanic era this changed when the Spaniards came and patterned the image of the Filipina to a meek and submissive individual. As it happened all over Asia, women in the Philippines were expected to become caring and nurturing mothers for their own children and take care of most household chores. Also a trait found all over Asia was the preference of most families to have male children instead of females.

During the last part of the colonization of the Philippines, Isabella II of Spain, introduced the Education Decree of 1863 (10 years before Japan had a compulsory free modern public education and 40 years before the United States government started a free modern public school system in the Philippines) that provided for the establishment and for the building of at least two free primary schools, one for the boys and another school for the girls, in each town under the responsibility of the municipal government. This decree, however, was not followed by many local governments due to the lasting patriarchal culture that Spain espoused.

=== American Philippines ===
When Spain lost the Spanish–American War in 1898, the Philippines was ceded to the United States of America. The U.S.A. introduced a new public education system which retained opportunity to every child regardless of gender.

Through the American-patterned school system, Filipino women became professionals, although most of them and their male counterparts opted for making use of their former education roots and expressed themselves in Spanish or Tagalog. According to the Monroe Commission on Philippine Education: “Upon leaving school, more than 99% of Filipinos will not speak English in their homes. Possibly, only 10% to 15% of the next generation will be able to use this language in their occupations. In fact, it will only be the government employees, and the professionals, who might make use of English.”

== Contemporary roles ==
Modern-day Philippine women play a decisive role in Filipino families. They usually handle the money, act as religious mentors, and can also make all the important family decisions.

=== Urban setting ===
In the past, firms and businesses generally hire Filipino women for less pay and secretarial functions. But at present, Filipino women are given the same opportunities as their male counterparts in the business realm. This is due to the political and economic changes at the global and national levels in urban society that have led to the growth of export-based industries and the service sector, which then created more opportunities for Filipino women.

About one-third of businesses in the Philippines are operated by Filipino women. Many Filipino businesswomen in the urban sector can be found in the hospitality sector, marketing, publishing, real estate, transportation, financial consulting, trade and services, electronics and appliances, and much more.

=== Rural and tribal clan setting ===
In rural areas, the Filipino woman runs the household even if she should have a job. The children approach her for money and help. She is the family's treasurer. She supports the children’s educational needs. For non-family members who require support, the wife is the person to be approached. However, the wife is neither the person who makes the final decision or the person who hands out the money.

Juan Flavier, a physician, an authority on community development, and a former Philippine senator, described in his book, Doctor to the Barrios, that "whether some (Filipino) men are willing to admit it or not"... "rural women in the Philippines wield considerable authority," the housewife in particular. This is especially if the housewife, who is often referred to as the Ilaw ng Tahanan (Light of the Home), is convinced of the benefits that will be gained from a certain practice such as the concept of family planning in the barrios. Flavier also mentioned that "In the Philippine barrio, the one responsible for the home" and its management "is the wife... she holds the key to... household... development."

=== Marriage and relationships ===
Courtship in the Philippines is conservative in nature. The man will have to court the woman and prove his love for her before he can win her heart. Sometimes the courtship period would last for years. This however, is a very old fashioned idea. In the bigger more urbanized cities, this conservative courtship idea is not so emphasized as much. Parents prefer their daughter to be courted in their home, so they can have a chance to know the man. It is during the courtship period that the man would put his best foot forward to create a good impression on the woman and her family. Generally, the man is being measured on his being a gentleman, ability to respect the woman's family, and servitude (the extent of what he was willing to do to prove his love for the woman). Usually, the woman is courted by several men and will have to choose the best from among her suitors. Courtship and relationships remain the same for rural and urban areas despite the modern western influence.

The Philippines and Vatican City are the only countries in the world to prohibit divorce (the Philippines allows divorce for Muslims). The Philippines is one of the few non-Muslim majority countries to maintain a criminal law against adultery; and the law differentiates between female infidelity (Article 333 called Adultery) and male infidelity (Article 334 called Concubinage, which has a more narrow definition and is punished less severely). Furthermore, Article 247 called Death or physical injuries inflicted under exceptional circumstances, provides that the killing of a spouse and/or of the partner of the spouse caught in the act of extramarital sex by the other spouse, as well as the killing of a daughter caught by the parent in the act of premarital sex, are to be punished only by the symbolic punishment of destierro (banishment from a geographical area for a period of time). These laws are based on old Spanish laws that were repealed in Spain in 1963 (the "crime of passion" law) and in 1978 (the adultery law). The Philippines is also one of 20 countries that still has a marry-your-rapist law (that is, a law that exonerates a rapist from punishment if he marries the victim after the attack).

Women in the pre-colonial Philippines enjoyed nearly equal status with men. Prior to colonization, both men and women could get a divorce for the following reasons: failure to meet family obligations, childlessness, and infidelity. Children, regardless of gender, and properties were equally divided in a divorce. Since a man needed to pay a dowry to the woman's family, she was required to give it back should she be found at fault. If the man was at fault, he then lost the right to get back his dowry.

In the Philippines, society valued offspring regardless of gender. Female children were as valuable as male ones, mainly because they recognized that women are as important as men. Parents provide equal opportunities to their children. Filipino daughters can also go to school, inherit property, and even become village chiefs like Filipino sons.

=== Babaylan in 21st century ===
The Babaylan figure has resurfaced in Filipino diasporic communities as the indigenous Filipino concept is borrowed as a tool for decolonization practices and post-colonial discourse today. The Babaylan tradition and Babaylan-inspired practices are seen as an indigenous spiritual path among Filipinos in the Philippines and in the diaspora as a means to remembering relations to their homeland and healing.

=== Female genital mutilation ===
Female genital mutilation (FGM) is performed in the Philippines in the predominately Muslim Bangsamoro region in the south of the country. While there is no official data on FGM in the Philippines, surveys suggest that 80–86% of Muslim girls and women in Bangsamoro have undergone FGM.

== Women at work ==
Traditionally, rural and tribal women have performed household related chores, while heavier work was done by men. In modern times, the significant toll of domestic labor has been an impediment to women in the workforce.

=== In 19th-century Manila ===
Below are some of the work that women in Manila performed during the 19th century:

==== Water Carrier ====
Aguadoras or women water carriers were responsible for transporting large clay jars filled with water from distant and cleaner sources such as the Marikina River. This was because Manila's rivers had no potable water, and the supply from the Carriedo Waterworks, which was Manila's first water system and only created in 1882, was limited. These women had to travel to nearby towns to fetch water, which they brought back to the city in water-filled jars, for family consumption or sold for profit.

==== Betel Leaf and Nut Seller ====
Betel nut chewing played a significant role in Philippine society in the past. Besides being beneficial for health, chewing betel leaf was a popular hobby among Filipinos.The high demand for betel leaves and betel nuts led to the emergence of buyeras. They wrapped betel nut and lime in betel leaves, and sold their goods along the pavements.

Milk Seller

Lecheras or women milk sellers played a crucial role in a time when refrigerators were not yet available. They roamed on streets, and had to balance a small jar of milk on their head and carry a bottle for transferring milk.

==== Cigarette Maker ====
Tobacco was as a major cash crop in the Philippines, leading to the establishment of factories. Cigarreras or women cigarette makers were predominantly employed in these factories. Their tasks involved preparing and wrapping tobacco leaves, cutting tobacco ends, counting production, and arranging the tobacco in boxes.

=== 20th-21st centuries ===
In the early 1900s, the female workforce in the Philippines was also a highly debated topic during workers’ conferences. In 1910, during the first Congress of Labor, the decision to enact a law that would regulate the employment of women and children was approved due to poor working conditions (“dark and ill-ventilated rooms, smoke-filled factories”, etc.) for women and children. Then, in March 1923, “An Act to Regulate the Employment of Women and Children in Agricultural and Non-Agricultural Establishments and Other Workplaces” was passed to oversee the welfare of women and children. In 1960, under the Department of Labor, the Bureau of Women and Minors was created and was responsible for the promotion, development, and the protection of the welfare of working women and minors. Since then, more acts were made to oversee the welfare of women workers, as seen in both the 1935 and 1973 constitutions.

The Philippine Institute for Development Studies reported in 2025 that "women are three to four times more likely than men to cite housework as their reason for not seeking employment." The majority of Filipino women also sought to limit their childbearing because it increased their domestic burdens.

In the workforce, millions of Filipino women often work in the unstable, low-paid informal job market, in positions such as street vendors and domestic workers. The Philippine Legislators' Committee on Population and Development has said that these workers lack job security, fair wages and benefits.

== Women in arts ==
In his paintings of Filipino women, the Philippine National Artist Fernando Amorsolo rejected Western ideals of beauty in favor of Filipino ideals. He said that the women he painted have "a rounded face, not of the oval type often presented to us in newspapers and magazine illustrations. The eyes should be exceptionally lively, not the dreamy, sleepy type that characterizes the Mongolian. The nose should be of the blunt form but firm and strongly marked. ... So the ideal Filipino beauty should not necessarily be white complexioned, nor of the dark brown color of the typical Malayan, but of the clear skin or fresh colored type which we often witness when we met a blushing girl."

== Women in politics ==
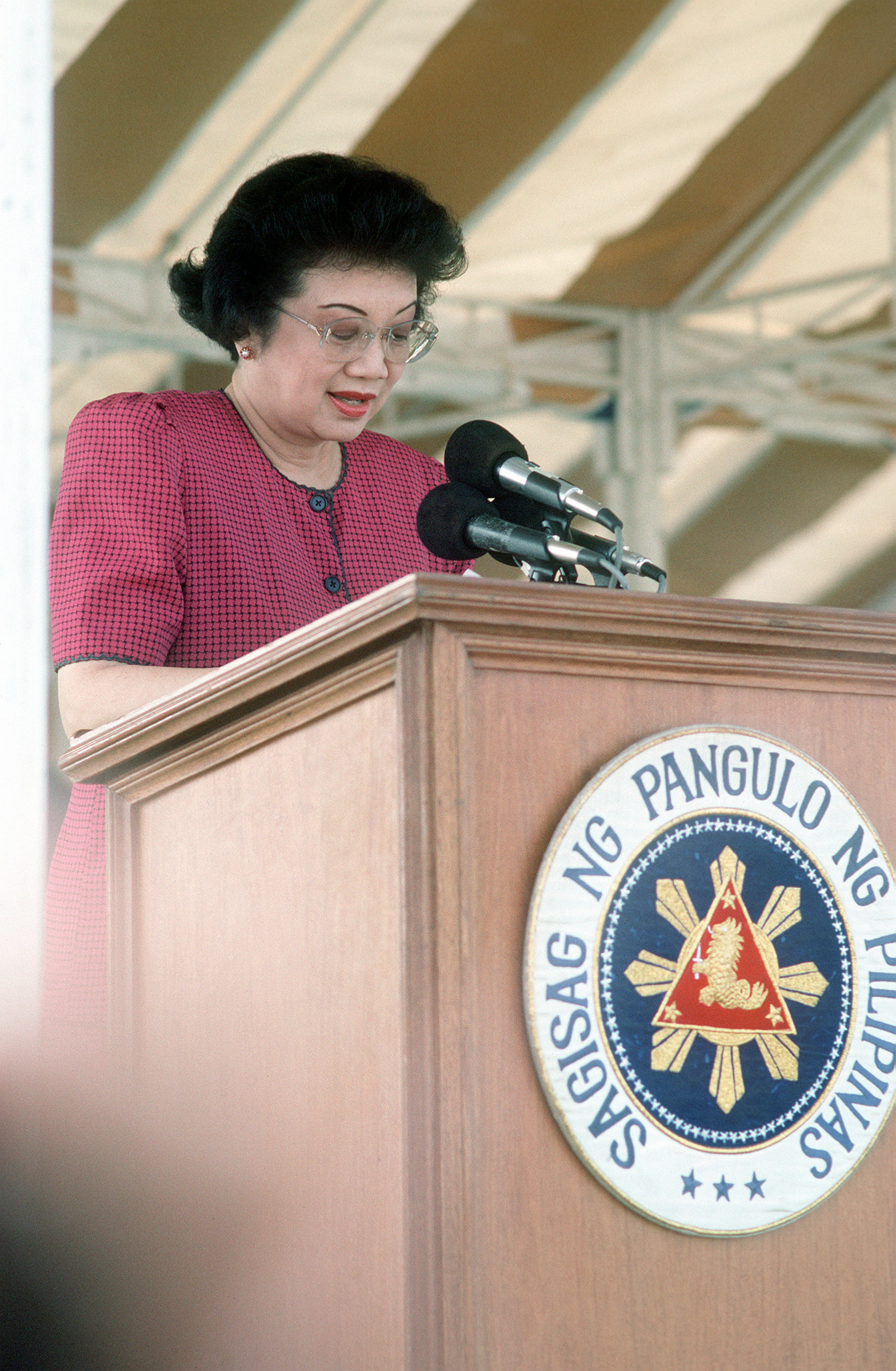
Corazon C. Aquino, 1992, the first female president of the Republic of the Philippines, recognized by the international diplomatic community as the "Mother of Asian Democracy".

Compared to other countries, Filipino women have gained and enjoyed equal rights with men. They have become presidents, senators, congresswomen, mayors. They have served in government offices, and have held cabinet positions for presidents. Filipino women have proven that they are capable of carrying out responsibilities and tasks as well as their male counterparts. There are 48 women Representatives elected in the 15th Congress (2010 national election). They accounted for (21.6%) of the total 222 Representatives as members of the Lower House. In 2010 Senatorial election, there were 14 women who ran out of 61 candidates (23.0%), of which two entered the top 12 winning senators (16.7%).

The number of women who engage in politics are smaller compare to their male counterparts. This was primarily because engagement in politics is considered "dirty."

A recent study revealed that there is a re-emergence of the empowerment of Filipino women through the political process, just as they were prior to the arrival of conquerors from Spain. Philippine women are rediscovering their strengths. Filipino women had been successful in implementing policies by becoming executive staff members, advisers to politicians, and as advocates within non-governmental organizations.

Modern-day Filipino women are making strides in electoral politics by initiating more female-oriented programs. They are performing well as leaders, although generally, Filipino women still often earn political seats by having fathers and husbands who are politically connected, a "dynasty system" that hinders other Filipino women from joining the electoral process. Other factors that prevent full-engagement of other well-qualified Filipino women from the Philippine political scene are the expense in politics and the importance of the family name.

Participation of Filipino women in Philippine politics was encouraged during the Beijing Declaration in 1995 at the United Nations' Fourth World Conference on Women. In February 2005, however, a United Nations review on the progress of Philippine women and their role in politics revealed that despite "an increase in the quality of female politicians, there was not enough increase in" the number of women participants in government activities. From 1992 to 2001, Filipino women had been elected as local chief executives, functioning as mayors, governors, and captains of villages. One influential factor contributing to the increasing number of female politicians, is the elevation of Corazon Aquino and Gloria Macapagal-Arroyo as Philippine women Presidents.

== Women's movement ==
The women's movement organized in the early 20th-century in organizations such as the Asociacion Feminista Filipina (1904) the Society for the Advancement of Women (SAW) and the Asociaction Feminist Ilonga, who campaigned for women's suffrage and other rights for gender equality.

== Prominent women ==
Prominent Filipino women writers include:

- Corazon Aquino
- Gabriela Silang
- Melchora Aquino
- Lualhati Bautista
- Leni Robredo

== In popular culture ==
- Novels
  - Three Filipino Women
  - Ermita: A Filipino Novel

== See also ==
- Romantic relationships
  - Courtship in the Philippines
  - List of ancient Philippine consorts
  - Single mother phenomenon of Philippines
- Women and government in the Philippines
  - National Commission on the Role of Filipino Women
  - Women in the Philippine military
  - Women in the Philippine National Police
  - First Lady of the Philippines
- Women's rights in the Philippines
  - Violence against women in the Philippines
  - Gender inequality in the Philippines
- Women in Asia
