= Women in the Philippine National Police =

Women in the Philippine National Police are women in the Philippines who joined the police force in the Philippines to become policewomen and law enforcers.

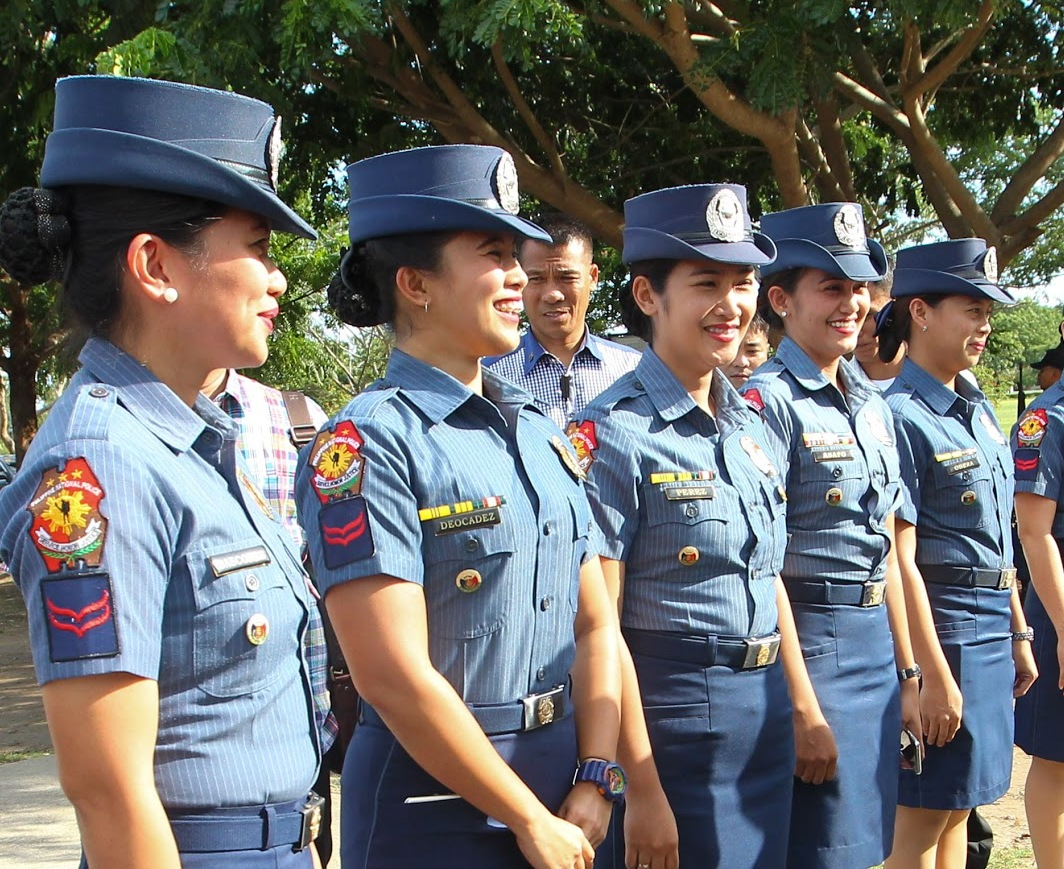
Female police officers in General Santos

When Filipino women started to join the male-dominated Philippine National Police (PNP), they were given only assignments that were administrative in nature and jobs that could be classified and described as "desk duties". Within the next thirty years - years after the establishment of the PNP in the early 1990s, female Filipino police officers have participated in other police activities and functions, including risky PNP operations. They have also become commanders in the field of police work. Among the Filipino policewomen who excelled in the PNP were Lina Sarmiento and Lorlie Arroyo.

In 2012, Sarmiento and Arroyo were the only two "female generals" in the PNP. They were both Chief Superintendents, with Sarmiento being the head of the Police Security and Protection Group (PSPG), while Arroyo was the head of the Crime Laboratory of the PNP. Arroyo's rank was equivalent to the rank of a brigadier general in the military. In June 2012, Sarmiento was promoted to become the "first two-star female general" of the PNP and the "first female general to be named in the Directorial Staff of the PNP" since the inception of the PNP.

In 2023, Portia B. Manalad made history as the first female graduate of the Philippine National Police Academy (PNPA) to hold the rank of Police Brigadier General. Manalad was the sole woman to graduate from the premier Philippine police academy in her batch in 1995 and is also the first recipient of Republic Act 7192, or the Women in Development and Nation Building Act which allowed women to be admitted, trained, and commissioned in the Armed Forces of the Philippines and the PNP. In 2019, Manalad also served as the first woman city police director of Cotabato City in Mindanao.

As of December 2023, data from the PNP showed there are 41,780 policewomen in the country, of which- 2,978 are officers while 38,802 are non-commissioned officers, comprising 18.32 percent of the 228,000-strong police force.

== See also ==
- Women in the Philippine military
