= International Federation of Women Lawyers =

Legal advocacy organization

- Formation: 1944
- Type: Professional association
- Purpose: To promote legal professionalism
- Official language: Spanish, English
- President: Carolina Rios Villota
- Website: www.fidafederation.org

The International Federation of Women Lawyers (IFWL), in Spanish Federación Internacional de Abogadas (FIDA), is an international non-governmental organization (NGO) that enhances the status of women and children by providing legal aid, legal literacy and education programs, and through advocacy, law reform, research and publications.

== History and activities ==
The Federación Internacional de Abogadas was established in 1944 in Mexico City. It obtained United Nations Consultative status in 1954. It works with the United Nations Economic and Social Council (ECOSOC), United Nations Educational, Scientific and Cultural Organization (UNESCO) and the International Labour Organization (ILO). FIDA publishes La Abogada Newsletter four times a year in Spanish and English, for members only. Every two years FIDA publishes La Abogada Internacional in English, French and Spanish.

In 2011 UNESCO said of the organization: "The quality of the work of the IFWL, a professional organization whose geographical extension is fair and representativeness relatively balanced, is undoubted. Admitted to Category C in 1961, it has co-operated with UNESCO since 1953 in the context of the consultative arrangements. It received a financial contribution from UNESCO for organizing the international congress of lawyers (1989). Its co-operation with UNESCO, which is operational in nature, has slackened in the last few years. It might consider drawing closer to NGOs that operate in similar fields."

== Presidents ==
Before 1960, Luisa A. Perez Peroso, and Rosalind Goodrich Bates both served terms as president of FIDA. (Note: The dates below reflect the conference each woman presided over; they were generally elected at the previous conference.)

Conference year	President	Host country of conference	Image
1960	Josefina Phodaca-Ambrosio	The Philippines	
1962	Esther Talamantes	Mexico	
1964	Violet Alva	India	
1967	Angie Brooks	Liberia	
1969	Mehrangiz Manouchehrian	Iran	
1971	Filomena Quintana	Chile	
1973	Mrs. Beng Oon	Malaysia	
1975	Helga Stödter	West Germany	
1977	J. Aduke Alakija	Nigeria	
1979	Dora Aberlin	United States	
1982	Ana Lucia Garcia	Venezuela	
1984	Daphne Anne Kok	Australia	
1986	Anca Postelnicu	Belgium	
1988	Rose Taylor	Ghana	
1990	Angela Cuevas de Dolmetsch	Colombia	
1992	Eugenia Charles	Bahamas	
1994	Nicole Huguenin-Gonon	France	
1996	Elsie Leung	Hong Kong	
1998	Surinder Kapila	Kenya	
2000	Mary Nelson Wilburn	United States	
2002	Alvarina Miranda de Almeida	Brazil	
2005	Puan Sri Saraswathy Devi	Malaysia	
2008	Pirkko K. Koskinen	Argentina	
2010	Giovanna Chiara	Italy	
2011	Stella Obiageli Ugboma	Nigeria	
2014	Sheela Anish	India	
2017	Jethlyn A. Burrows	Bahamas	
2020	Shadhana Gunaratnam	Switzerland	
2023	Carolina Rios Villota	Colombia	

== Regional affiliates ==
As of 2011 there were affiliated organizations and individuals in 73 countries:

- Cameroon, Democratic Republic of the Congo, Egypt, Ghana, Kenya, Lesotho, Liberia, Nigeria, Senegal, Sierra Leone, South Africa, Sudan, Togo
- Argentina, Bermuda, Bolivia, Brazil, Canada, Chile, Colombia, Costa Rica, Dominica, Dominican Republic, Ecuador, Guatemala, Guyana, Honduras, Jamaica, Mexico, Netherlands Antilles, Panama, Paraguay, Peru, Trinidad and Tobago, Uruguay, United States of America, Venezuela
- Bangladesh, Hong Kong/China, India, Indonesia, Iran - Islamic Republic of, Israel, Japan, Republic of Korea, Lebanon, Malaysia, Pakistan, Philippines, Singapore, Sri Lanka, Taiwan/China, Thailand
- Australia, New Zealand
- Belgium, Cyprus, Denmark, Finland, France, Germany, Greece, Ireland, Italy, Luxembourg, Netherlands, Norway, Portugal, Spain, Sweden, Switzerland, Turkey, United Kingdom of Great Britain and Northern Ireland

=== Ghana ===
FIDA Ghana was founded in 1974. The association set up the first legal aid program in Ghana in 1985, mainly targeting indigent women and children. To help people understand the law, FIDA Ghana has developed booklets that present some of the existing laws affecting the status of women and children in simple English, and in translations into the Dagbani, Ewe, Ga, and Akan languages.

=== Kenya ===
FIDA Kenya was formed in 1985 after the third United Nations World Conference on Women, which was held in Nairobi. FIDA Kenya was affiliated to the Federation International De Abogadas until 1993. As of 2011 FIDA Kenya had over 600 members. FIDA Kenya prepared a "shadow report" on the Kenyan Government's 2007 report on the UN Convention on the Elimination of All Forms of Discrimination Against Women. The report questioned the accuracy of the government's report and raised concerns about lack of government commitment to the advancement of women.

=== Nigeria ===
FIDA-Nigeria was founded in May 1982 to promote the welfare of women and children and remove harmful laws. It provides free legal services to women and children, provides education and publications to help explain the law, and runs seminars, workshops and conferences.

Pamphlets cover subjects such as juvenile delinquency, rights of women, forced and early marriages and the effects of female circumcision.

=== United States ===
FIDA USA was re-established in September 2020. It publishes news, articles, and journal articles discussing the rights of women and children in the US. FIDA USA participates in conferences and events organized under the agenda of the United Nations.
