= Cesare Syjuco =

Multi-media artist, painter, poet, and art critic from Manila, Philippines

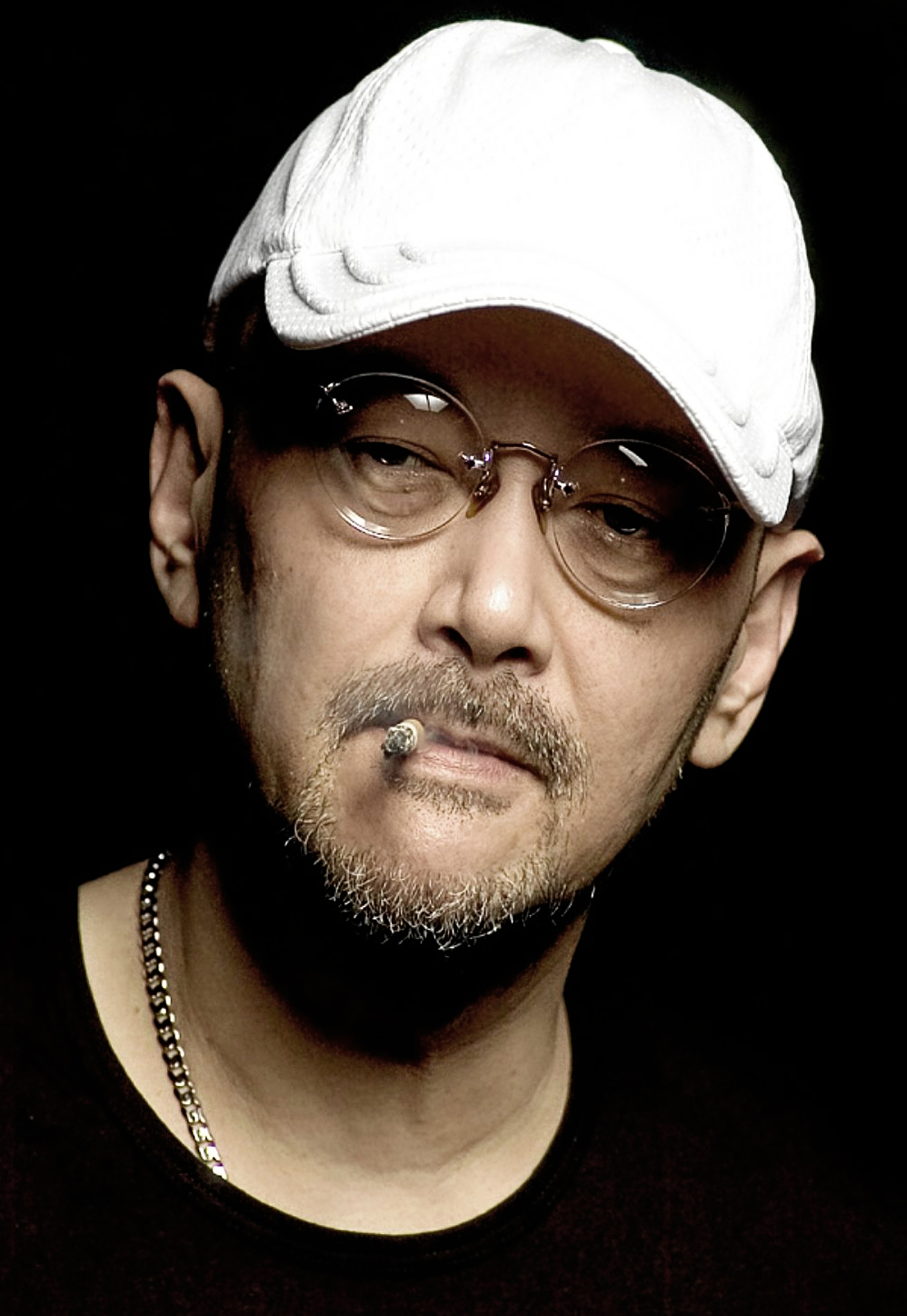
Artist Cesare A.X. Syjuco

Cesar Augusto "Cesare" Limcaco Syjuco (born 20 August 1953) is a multi-media artist, painter, poet and art critic from Manila, Philippines.

From 2004 to 2005, he made his first Manila appearance in 12 years by unveiling his solo exhibition entitled Flashes of Genius at the Main Gallery of the Philippines' Cultural Center. Showcasing his Literary Hybrids, a fusion of poetry and the visual arts, the exhibition was described as "a stunning comeback... a brilliant achievement for Philippine Art as a whole."

A flurry of smaller exhibitions won him the Araw Ng Maynila "Patnubay Ng Sining At Kalinangan" Award in 2007 from the 436-year-old City of Manila, and the 2007 La Sallian Achievement Award for the Arts from his alma mater, De La Salle University.

He recently released a 15-track CD Album and Book Set titled “A Sudden Rush of Genius”, featuring his avant-garde poetry and music.

He is currently building the New Art Lab, a non-profit developmental art facility (founded with his wife, Jean Marie Syjuco), which served as the haven of experimental art in the 1990s.

== Awards and distinctions ==
- T.O.Y.M. (Ten Outstanding Young Men of the Philippines) Award for Art & Culture Advancement
- Gerry Roxas Foundation Presidential Award for Outstanding Achievement in the Arts
- Gawad CCP Sa Sining Biswal from the Cultural Center of the Philippines
- A.A.P. Grand Prize and Gold Medal for Painting from the Art Association of the Philippines
- Don Carlos Palanca Memorial Award for Literature in English Poetry
- UNESCO Paris Gold Medals for Photography and Design
- CMMA Outstanding Filipino Communicator citation from the Catholic Mass Media Awards
- Purita Kalaw-Ledesma Award for Art Criticism
- Araw Ng Maynila "Patnubay Ng Sining at Kalinangan" Para Sa "Makabagong Pamamaraan" (for "New Art Forms")
- La Sallian Achievement Award for Outstanding Contribution to Philippine Art & Culture
