= Jean Marie Syjuco =

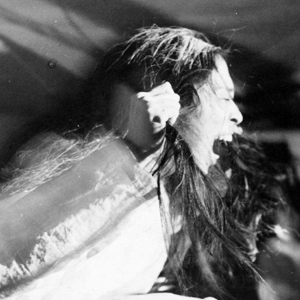
Performance and visual artist Jean Marie Syjuco

Jean Marie Syjuco (born June 26, 1952) is a painter, installation artist, and performance artist from Manila, Philippines.

Through the 1980s and the 1990s, Jean Marie brought attention and institutional support to the maverick art-form of Performance Art in the Philippines. Beginning in the 1970s as an extension of her work as a visual artist, her performance works developed from conceptual pieces of marked brevity rooted in anti-narrative devices, to the thematic spectacles and large-scale collaborations and video documentations for which she is now better known.

For over 3 decades, she has balanced her roles as a painter of Abstract and Fantasy genres, sculptor, installation and performance artist. Since she was awarded the Gold Medal for Sculpture in the 1980 AAP (Art Institution of the Philippines) Annual Art Competition, her transmedia objects and installations have occupied a unique place in contemporary art for their avant-garde melding of folk and technological elements.

Jean Marie Syjuco was a recipient of the 1990 Cultural Center of the Philippines Gawad CCP Para Sa Sining Biswal Award.

Currently, she is building the New “Art Lab”, a non-profit developmental art facility (founded with her husband, Cesare Syjuco), which served as the haven of experimental art in the 1990s.
