= Violence against women in the Philippines =

Violence against women in the Philippines includes different forms of gender-based violence. The term "violence against women" is "the word or concept (that) has been used in a broad, inclusive manner to encompass verbal abuse, intimidation, physical harassment, homicide, sexual assault, and rape." This form of violence is gender-biased. Violence occurs precisely because of their gender, specifically because the victims are women.

According to the 2017 National Demographic and Health Survey in the Philippines, one in every four (or 26%) ever-married women aged 15–49 had ever experienced physical, sexual or emotional violence by their husband or partner. Additionally, one in five (20%) women had reported ever experiencing emotional violence, 14% had ever experienced physical violence, and 5% had ever experienced sexual violence by their current or most recent husband or partner.

== History ==
=== Pre-colonial Period ===
The Philippines' early history goes as far back as 30,000 years ago when the Negritos (the primary people of the Philippine archipelago) were believed to have journeyed to the Philippines by land bridges from Mainland Asia.

The pre-colonial society offered women the greatest opportunities in relation to their social positions. Filipino women were allowed to hold high positions in their communities (as healers and priestesses). It was also common for women to take leadership roles in the barangays (See Barangay) and to fight as warriors. During the pre-colonial period, one of the first things that a man learned was that he had to respect women. At this particular point in history, disrespecting women was unthinkable. If a man was caught disrespecting women, he was labelled negatively by the rest of society.

While the heads of the barangays (in terms of both economic and political matters) were often men, women at that time already had rights. Some rights of women during the pre-colonial period are as follows:

1. to be treated as an equal by her husband and to share his honors
2. to retain her maiden name
3. to freely dispose of the property she had brought into the marriage
4. to be consulted or informed by her husband about his business affairs and contracts
5. to divorce her husband in case of non-support or maltreatment
6. to assume the headship in the barangay
7. to have a baby or not, whether she is married or not
8. to name her children

All of the rights mentioned above were freely exercised by women in the Philippines even before the country was colonized by the Spaniards, Americans, and the Japanese. Furthermore, "women had an unquestioned preferred role in religious ceremonies as babaylanes or catalones (priestesses)." It can be said that early men and women were equal in the pre-colonial society. The Filipino woman then was rarely abused and discriminated against—she was in fact a woman of strength and power.

=== Colonial Period ===
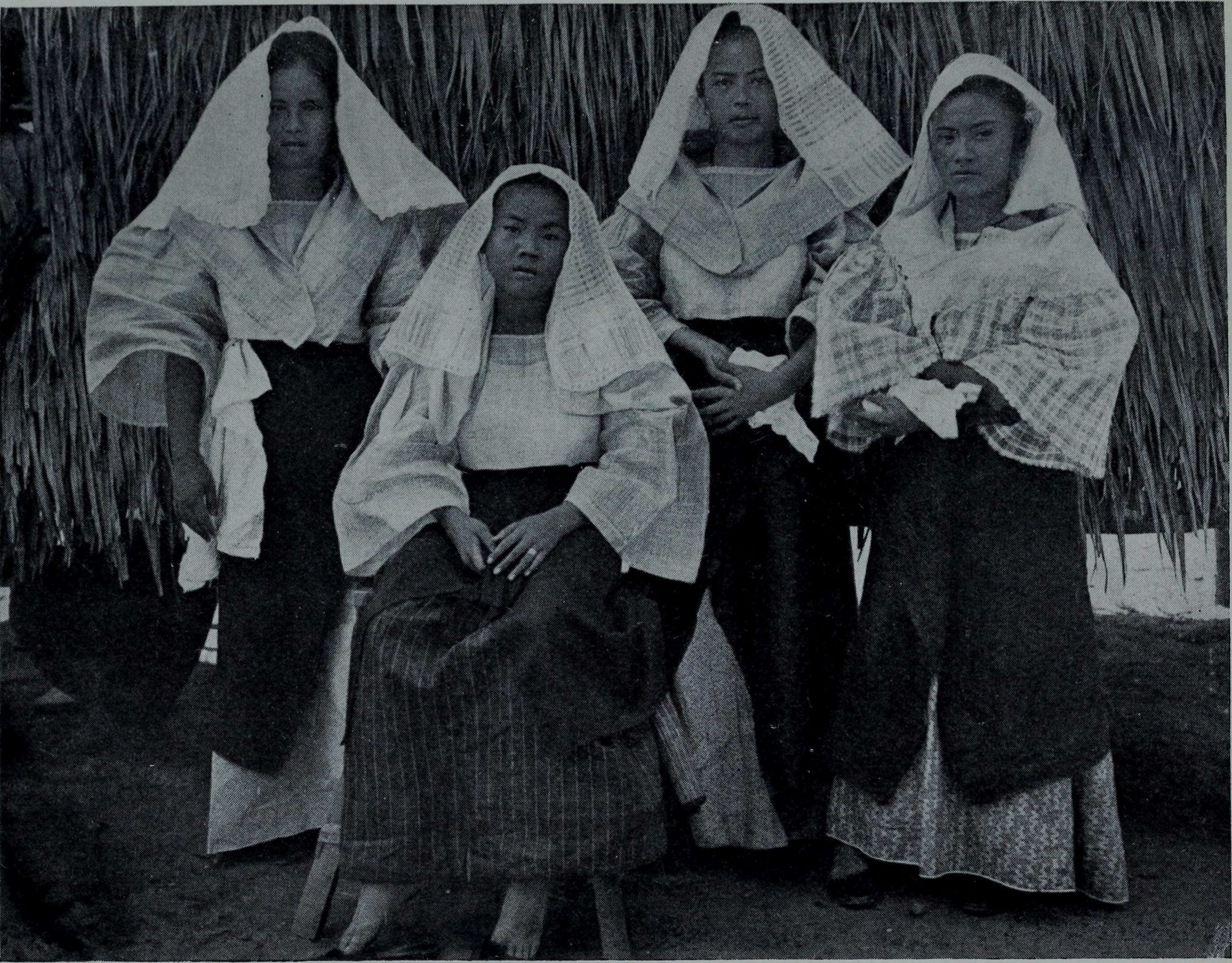
Filipino women of the lower class (during the Spanish occupation) ready for Church

==== Spanish occupation (1565–1898) ====
Under the service of the King of Spain, Ferdinand Magellan led an expedition to further explore territories that were not yet discovered by Europe. On March 16, 1521, Ferdinand Magellan reached the land—Sugubu, now known as Cebu (See History of the Philippines (1521–1898)). Spain ruled the Philippines for over 333 years where the Spaniards treated both men and women poorly. The Spaniards saw the Filipinos as 'indios', seeing themselves as of higher social standing than the natives. In the process of colonization, the Spaniards harmed and committed several acts of violence against Filipino women. With the emergence of the Spanish–American War in 1898, the conditions of men—more specifically, the women—worsened.

Several narratives and works mention how Filipino women experienced all kinds of exploitation during the Spanish occupation. In general, women were unable to execute their rights and were restricted by certain norms and expectations in society. Filipino women were not allowed to share their ideas nor participate in the decision-making process. They tilled the land with their husbands as peasants for pittance. Women stayed as inferior to men and were discriminated against not only by men, but by the very institutions they belonged to in society (i.e. family, Church, community, etc.). While Filipino men were also considered as peasants or low-lives, Filipino women under the Spanish occupation were far inferior to peasants—they were arguably seen as slaves.

Aside from the discrimination, some Filipinas were violated by parish priests as many young women were often raped or sexually abused in beaterios.

Furthermore, during Spain's 333 year rule in the Philippines, the colonists had to fight off the Chinese pirates, Dutch forces, Portuguese forces, and indigenous revolts. Moros from Western Mindanao and the Sulu Archipelago also raided the coastal Christian areas of Luzon and the Visayas. Because of these conflicts in the archipelago, Filipinos were occasionally captured as prisoners and as a result, many of the women were sold to the opposing forces as slaves.

With the Spaniards taking control of all aspects of Philippine society, the identity of the Filipino woman as a woman of strength and power was soon forgotten. The Spaniards created a new image of the ideal Filipino woman. The ideal Filipino woman was someone who was overly religious, submissive, and obedient. While men were given the opportunity to study, women were forced into learning religion and home-making. A Filipina was to become one of two things: a nun or a wife. The real Filipina was replaced by the ideal woman (the "Maria Clara") dictated by the Spaniards. Women were no longer allowed to hold high ranking positions in society and as mentioned earlier, were banned from participating in public and political events. During the Spanish occupation, women were seen as inferior to men and as such, men rose as the dominant gender, establishing a patriarchal society that has prevailed to this very day.

==== American rule (1898–1946) ====
In the year 1898, the United States seized control over the Philippines shortly after defeating the remaining Spanish forces in the country. With the signing of the Treaty of Paris, the Philippines was turned over by the Spaniards to the Americans for $20 million. Still coming to terms with their new-found freedom, the Filipinos went against the American forces as the Americans tried to establish control over the country (See Philippine–American War).

At the time of the Filipino-American war, as with all wars, there was a massive amount of bloodshed. Records estimate that about 1.5 million people died out of a total of 6 million people in the Philippines. Filipino civilians: 250,000–1,000,000 died, largely because of famine and disease; including 200,000 who died from cholera. While there are many estimates for civilian deaths, with some even going well over a million for the war, modern historians generally place the death toll between 200,000 and 1,000,000.

In an account by an American soldier, he mentioned that at one point, the Americans were forced to burn barrios as there was too much insurgent activity. They resulted to torturing men and women alike in hopes that they could provide the information they needed. During the war, the Americans did not spare women and as such, Filipino women were raped (for information), physically hurt, or killed. Since the husbands of the women were away for war, the women were often left at home and became vulnerable targets to various abuses by the American soldiers. In one of the accounts of General Jacob Smith about the war, he stated that he ordered a Major Waller to kill and burn everyone and everything at Balangiga in the Samar province and not to take in any prisoners. He even specified that all those who were capable of wielding a gun must die and everyone age 10 and up must be killed. Overall, it can be seen that during the American rule in the Philippines, Filipino women were widely abused. Stories of American soldiers raping Filipino women have been reported and heard of countless times but no one knows to what extend or if it's greatly exaggerated. While Americans did not take a lot of prisoners during the war, the Americans resorted to killing almost everyone—all the women at sight.

Besides the bloodshed, women in the Philippines were still discriminated against. An instance of such discrimination was evident in public schools as the teachers did not care nor support the idea of gender equality. Even though women were allowed to vote, the society still preferred male candidates and did not allow women to run for public office. Filipino parents were also led to believe that sending their daughters to secondary and tertiary levels of education was a waste. This was because the Filipino woman during the American occupation was largely dependent on her husband. Her status in life was solely reflected by the image of the man that she would wed. While women were given the right to education, women were still seen as inferior to men. The Filipino woman was forced to fit into the roles of a daughter and a wife. Even if education flourished in the country (as the literacy rate increased), gender parity was not successful. The women in the Philippines at that time were still arguably "not free" as they remained bound in and limited by the expectations of society.

==== Japanese occupation (1942–1945) ====
The Pacific War began mainly because Japan—an emerging power in Asia—sought "to create a great Empire." On December 8, 1941, Japan "opened a surprise attack on the Philippines—attacking without warning—just ten hours after the attack on Pearl Harbor." Unshaken by the presence of the Americans in the Philippines, the Japanese forces landed at the Lingayen Gulf and continued on to conquer the rest of Manila. With Manila falling to the hands of the Japanese forces, the troops from the Land of the Rising Sun invaded the whole of the Philippines, occupying it from 1942 to 1945.

During the Japanese occupation, Filipino women were greatly abused and violated. At this particular time in history, Filipino women were threatened and forced to labor as "comfort women." Upon their arrival in the country, the Japanese built "houses of relaxation" or comfort stations where Korean, Filipino, and Chinese women were brought and forced into service. From 1941 to 1942—when the Japanese soldiers were just starting to invade the Philippines—thousands of Filipino women were taken from their homes and forced to provide the Imperial Japanese Army all kinds of sexual services. Because most of the men were at war, the women were left practically defenseless in their own homes and without a choice but to submit their bodies to the Japanese. In some cases, even "their fathers or husbands were killed in front of them (the women) and their other family members."

Countless accounts and testimonies of women tell the horrific stories of how Filipino women were grabbed off the streets and "taken to Japanese military camps or garrisons, which were former wither municipal/provincial building, big private houses, elementary/high school buildings, hospitals, or churches." In these camps, the women were sexually abused and raped usually by a group of Japanese soldiers. Oftentimes, it was young girls that were "recruited" to become comfort women. These girls' ages would range from six to twenty years old. The period of confinement ranged from three days to more than a year. Some stories say that aside from sexual services, the Japanese did more than rape women. The Filipino women were subjected to other kinds of violence and trauma, particularly from confinement, starvation, and maltreatment. In some cases, the Japanese went as far as killing women who fought back or escaped.

=== Post-colonial Period (1945-1986) ===
Violence against women was not as widespread or public compared to the years when the Philippines was under the rule of the Spaniards, Americans, and the Japanese.

After World War II, more and more women had become politicized. In the beginning, not too many women were present in mainstream politics. Eventually, many Filipino women "joined ideological groups, while others became combatants of the rebel movements." Various pro-women groups flourished such as MAKIBAKA (Malayang Kilusan ng Bagong Kababaihan), KABAPA (Katipunan ng Bagong Pilipinas), and GABRIELA (General Assembly Binding Women for Reforms, Integrity, Equality, Leadership, and Action). Not a lot of these movements, however, survived throughout the years. Most—if not all—groups disbanded, mostly dying out during the Marcos regime (See History of the Philippines (1965–86)). The disbanded feminist group members scattered across different political parties, while others joined forces with GABRIELA.

The postcolonial era brought about "patriarchal contradictions [and] the dichotomized icons of idealized femininity and degraded whoredom, of feminine plenitude and feminine lack." Women in the Philippines "were removed from the reigning paradigm of patriarchy (thrice colonized in the process of history, first by the patriarchy within and then by the colonizers from without and then again by the nation-builders)." Instead of setting right the wrongs let loose by the colonizing patriarchs, "the national patriarchy continued the colonization of women by desecrating the female body and by degrading women to mere bodies." The "performative display of violence on the female body (therefore) carried out by the country’s power-wielders contains, besides its pornographic import, the ominous implication that it will be told and retold as a moral tale to threaten women into submission and subjugation."

While it was not as rampant as in the previous years, violence against women still happened during the postcolonial period as women in the Philippines were often sexually abused, harassed, and objectified by the rest of society.

=== Contemporary History (1986-present) ===
Today, violence against women remains to be one of the most persistent and alarming issues that the Philippines has faced.

In the reports of the Philippine National Police (PNP), the statistics revealed that there has been a steady increase in VAW cases reported to them from 1997 to 2013.

- The year 2013 was reported to have had the most cases of VAW in history. The number of VAW cases increased to 49.9 percent from 2012 to 2013. From these reports, a total of 16,517 cases was filed under the complaint or violation of the RA 9262 (in 2013).
- According to the information gathered by the PNP, the general category of the violation of RA 9262 is the most prominent type of VAW, accounting for 57 percent of the total number of VAW cases reported. Physical injury comes in at second with an accumulated 19.7 percent of the reported VAW Cases.
- Region 6 (or Western Visayas) was found to have had the highest number of reported VAW cases nationwide in 2013 with a record-breaking 4,833 reported cases (which accounts for 20.3 percent of the total reported VAW cases in the Philippines). Among the highest number of VAW cases was Region 11 (Davao) with 18.5 percent and Region 7 (Central Visayas) with 14.5 percent. The region which had the fewest reported VAW cases was the Autonomous Region in Muslim Mindanao (ARMM) with just 86 cases.

The Philippine Statistics Authority’s National Demographic and Health Survey 2022 found that 17.5 % of Filipino women ages 15-49 have experienced physical, sexual or emotional violence from their intimate partners. The 2021 survey also revealed 8,399 reported cases of physical violence, composed of 1,791 rape and 1,505 acts of lasciviousness.

== Types of violence ==
Violence against women may take different forms at the individual, community, and the societal level. The most common forms of violence include that of rape, domestic violence, stalking, sexual harassment, human trafficking, forced prostitution, state violence, and female genital mutilation.

== Legislation and laws ==
In 1937, the women in the Philippines were first granted the right to vote through the Women's Suffrage Bill (which was approved in a special plebiscite mandated by Commonwealth Act No. 34). Even at that time, women were repeatedly look down upon, abused, and discriminated against in society.

Before special laws addressing violence against women were passed, women could only resort to the Revised Penal Code for defense. Today, the Philippine government has passed several legislation and laws that address the problem of violence against women. Among the Philippine laws that aim to protect women are: Republic Act No. 9262, Republic Act No. 9710, and Republic Act No. 8371.

=== Republic Act No. 9262 ===
Republic Act No. 9262 is known as The Anti-Violence against Women and their Children Act of 2004. Recognizing "the need to protect the family and its members particularly women and children from violence and threats to their personal safety and security", RA 9262 was signed by former President Gloria Macapagal Arroyo on March 8, 2004.

Under the RA 9262, VAW refers to "any act or a series of acts committed by any person against a woman who is his wife, former wife, or against a woman with whom the person has or had a sexual or dating relationship, or with whom he has a common child, or against her child whether legitimate or illegitimate, within or without the family abode, which result in or is likely to result in physical, sexual, psychological harm or suffering, or economic abuse including threats of such acts, battery, assault, coercion, harassment, or arbitrary deprivation of liberty."

Furthermore, RA 9262 gives women and their children the right to file a protection order. A protection order is "an order issued for the purpose of preventing further acts of violence against a woman or her child and granting other necessary relief." The protection order "safeguards the victim from further harm, minimizing any disruption in the victim's daily life and facilitating the opportunity and ability of the victim to independently regain control over her life." The types of protection orders that may be issued are: the barangay protection order (BPO), the temporary protection order (TPO), and the permanent protection order (PPO).

For BPOs, the order is usually issued by the Punong Barangay or Barangay Kagawad. Barangay officials are expected to "respond immediately to a call for help or request for assistance or protection of the victim." Likewise, they are expected to "arrest the suspected perpetrator without a warrant when any of the acts of violence is occurring, or when he/she has personal knowledge that any act of abuse has just been committed, and there is imminent danger to the life or limb of the victim." Any barangay official or law enforcer who fails to report the incident shall be liable for a fine not exceeding P10,000 and/or whenever applicable, criminal, civil, or administrative liability.

=== Republic Act No. 9710 ===
Known as the Magna Carta of Women, Republic Act No. 9710 "affirms the role of women in national building and ensures the substantive equality of women and men" in society. Pushing for the empowerment of women and for equal opportunities for both women and men, RA 9710 highlights the state's position, particularly of how the state "condemns discrimination against women in all its forms and pursues." RA 9710 was signed on August 14, 2009, by former President Gloria Macapagal Arroyo.

The MCW consists of provisions on: (1) the principle of human rights of women, (2) the definition of women's rights, (3) the duties related to the human rights of women, (4) the rights and empowerment of women (especially those in affected by calamities or disasters, in the marginalized sectors, or in especially difficult situations), (5) the institutional mechanisms through which rights of women are protected and upheld, and finally, (6) the implementing rules and regulations concerning the Magna Carta.

=== Republic Act No. 8371 ===
Republic Act No. 8371 is known as The Indigenous Peoples Rights Act of 1997. Signed on October 29, 1997, RA 8371 highlights the state's recognition and promotion of all the rights of Indigenous Cultural Communities/Indigenous Peoples (ICCs/IPs).

Under RA 8371, ICCs or IPs "refer to a group of people or homogenous societies identified by self-ascription and ascription by other, who have continuously lived as organized community on communally bounded and defined territory, and who have, under claims of ownership since time immemorial, occupied, possessed customs, tradition, and other distinctive cultural traits or who have, through resistance to political, social, and cultural inroads of colonization, non-indigenous religions and culture, became historically differentiated from the majority of Filipinos."

=== Other Philippine laws ===
Among other pieces of legislation that are related to VAW and were passed by the Philippine government to protect the rights of women are:

1. The Anti-Sexual Harassment Act of 1995 (Republic Act No. 7877)
2. The Anti-Rape Law of 1997 (Republic Act No. 8353)
3. The Anti-Trafficking in Persons Act of 2003 (Republic Act No. 9208)
4. The Rape Victim Assistance and Protection Act of 1998 (Republic Act No. 8505)
5. The Women in Development and Nation Building Act (Republic Act No. 7192)
6. The Anti-Child Pornography Act of 2009 (Republic Act No. 9775)
7. The Special Protection of Children Against Child Abuse, Exploitation and Discrimination Act (Republic Act No. 7610)
8. The Family Courts Act of 1997 (Republic Act No. 8369)
9. The Revised Penal Code (Republic Act No. 3815)
10. The Responsible Parenthood and Reproductive Health Act of 2012 (Republic Act No. 10354)
11. The Domestic Workers Act (or Batas Kasambahay) (Republic Act No. 10361)
12. The Solo Parents' Welfare Act of 2000 (Republic Act No. 8972)

== Government, non-government, and other organizations ==
=== Philippine Commission on Women ===
Formerly known as the National Commission on the Role of Filipino Women (NCRFW), the Philippine Commission on Women (PCW) serves as the voice for Filipino women. The organization performs as the main body, which relay gender and feminist concerns to the Philippine government. The PCW is the main advocate of gender equality and women empowerment in the Philippines.

The PCW was first established on January 7, 1975, upon the passing of Presidential Decree No. 633. The PCW acted as the main consultant of the President regarding matters concerning the welfare of women in the country.

Its main priorities during that time were as follows:

- Organizing women into a nationwide movement called "Balikatan sa Kaunlaran" (or shoulder-to-shoulder in development) This organization is now registered as an independent women's organization.
- Conducting policy studies and lobbying for the issuance of executive and legislative measures concerning women
- Establishing a clearinghouse and information center on women
- Monitoring the implementation of the UN Convention on the Elimination of All Forms of Discrimination Against Women (CEDAW).

After the Martial Law, the new administration ordered for a change in the Constitution, which led the NCRFW to revise its platform and ultimately, decide to prioritize the "mainstreaming [of] women’s concerns in policy making, planning, and programming of all government agencies." The organization's main concern now is not to be merely an adviser to the President, but to voice out the concerns of Filipino women in society, spearhead the creation of laws that support the welfare of women, and make sure that all women that work not only in government agencies, but also in the whole Philippines, get the rightful and equal treatment as men do.

The establishment of the gender equality principle in the 1987 Philippine Constitution indicated that the concern for the welfare of women rose as one of the top priorities of the government. Only two years after the integration of the 1987 Philippine Constitution, the very first Philippine Development Plan for Women (PDPW)—which would go on for three years (1989–1992)—was established through Executive Order No. 348. This was followed by the passing of RA 7192, also known as the Women in Nation-Building Act. The Women in Nation Building Act advocates for the equal treatment of women and men in Philippine society. It likewise promotes the equal importance of women in the building of the Philippine nation.

The NCRFW was renamed to the Philippine Commission on Women upon the enactment of RA 9710 (or the Magna Carta of Women).

=== GABRIELA Women's Party ===
General Assembly Binding Women for Reforms, Integrity, Equality, Leadership, and Action or GABRIELA, for short, is a leftist Philippine organization—specifically a party list that advocates issues related to that of women and children. It is composed of over 200 organizations and institutions all concerned about the welfare of women in the Philippines.

GABRIELA was established in April 1984 after 10,000 women came together and protested against the Marcos administration. It was also at this particular point of history that the group decided to name their organization as "GABRIELA" in honor of the woman who fought alongside the Katipunan against the Spaniards in the 18th century, Gabriela Silang.

GABRIELA is focused on addressing issues that affect women such as domestic violence, sexual abuse, gender inequality, sex trafficking, and rape culture as well as issues that affect the Philippines in general namely poverty, militarism, health, and globalization.

=== SAVE Our Women ===
Stop the Abuse and Violence against Our Women (SAVE Our Women) was founded in 2007 in Baguio city. It is a local non-government organization that provides psycho-social support and referrals to female survivors of domestic and intimate-relationship violence (and their children). The organization also aims to spread awareness about the realities and prevalence of domestic and intimate-relationship violence through information dissemination of facts, statistics, procedures, and Philippines laws that protect women, prosecute abusers, and prevent further abuse. Mainly serving Baguio City and suburbs, SAVE Our Women works with various agencies and volunteers, including lawyers, guidance counselors, and other service-providers, in the city to spread its advocacy.

=== Bathaluman Crisis Centre Foundation ===
The Bathaluman Crisis Centre Foundation is a non-profit organization established in 1991 to help female survivors of violence. The foundation provides a support system, including a service and referral centre, to help survivors deal with their physical trauma.

=== Women's Crisis Centre ===
Established in 1989, the Women's Crisis Centre (WCC) provides a supportive and affirming environment in which women who have survived violence can interact with other survivors through group counselling, education programs, recreation activities, or skills training.

=== Bantay Bata 163 ===
Bantay Bata is a welfare organization and foundation founded by ABS-CBN in 1997. The main objective of Bantay Bata is to respond to children's needs. They respond to reports about domestic violence and child abuse. Bantay Bata also helps children who have serious illnesses or are inflicted with rare diseases. Its emergency hotline is 1-6-3 and is accessible anywhere in the Philippines. Concerns of Bantay Bata include child abuse, child neglect, child trafficking, and domestic violence.

Although its headquarters is located in Mother Ignacia, Quezon City, the foundation has ventured out of Metro Manila and has offices in cities and municipalities all over the Philippines. This helps the foundation to respond immediately and cater to reports more efficiently. A recent addition to their services is their online counseling for child abuse victims and child-family relationships.

Furthermore, Bantay Bata spearheads psychosocial activities that help the child victims cope with their difficult pasts and experiences. The foundation also organizes seminars all over the country, raising awareness about child abuse, domestic violence, or child trafficking. Some Bantay Bata projects include medical-dental services, child counseling, the Children's Crisis Center (which serves as a temporary home for child abuse victims until their cases are resolved), and the Children's Village (which takes in children who need further attention and care).

== See also ==
- Child pornography in the Philippines
- Crime in the Philippines
- Human trafficking in the Philippines
- Prostitution in the Philippines
- Rape in the Philippines
- Women in the Philippines
- Women's rights in the Philippines
- Gender inequality in the Philippines
- Philippine Commission on Women
