= Women's rights in the Philippines =

The position of the Philippines on women's rights is relatively developed compared to many other nations. Over the past century, noticeable developments have been made which have led to greater endorsement and protection of these rights. The progression towards gender equality came about through women's movements, increased numbers of women political representatives, increased numbers of educated women, greater specificity on women's issues instituted under legislation, and the focused application of those laws. In recent years, the Filipino government has addressed the rights of women under a multitude of legislative schemes including workplace discrimination, domestic violence, sexual harassment and human trafficking.

The Philippines has one of the smallest rates of gender disparity in the world. In the Global Gender Gap Index 2017, the Philippines ranked 10th out of 145 countries for gender equality. The Philippines ranks higher than any other Asia-Pacific country but New Zealand. These roles range between the traditional position of mother, looking after children and household, to positions in the political arena.

Despite the great progress and achievements for women's rights the Philippines has garnered so far, the country is still in need of further development. There exists a discrepancy between women who have politically, academically and financially excelled, compared to women who are domestically abused, financially unstable and who are exploited through prostitution and migrant work.

== Suffrage movement ==
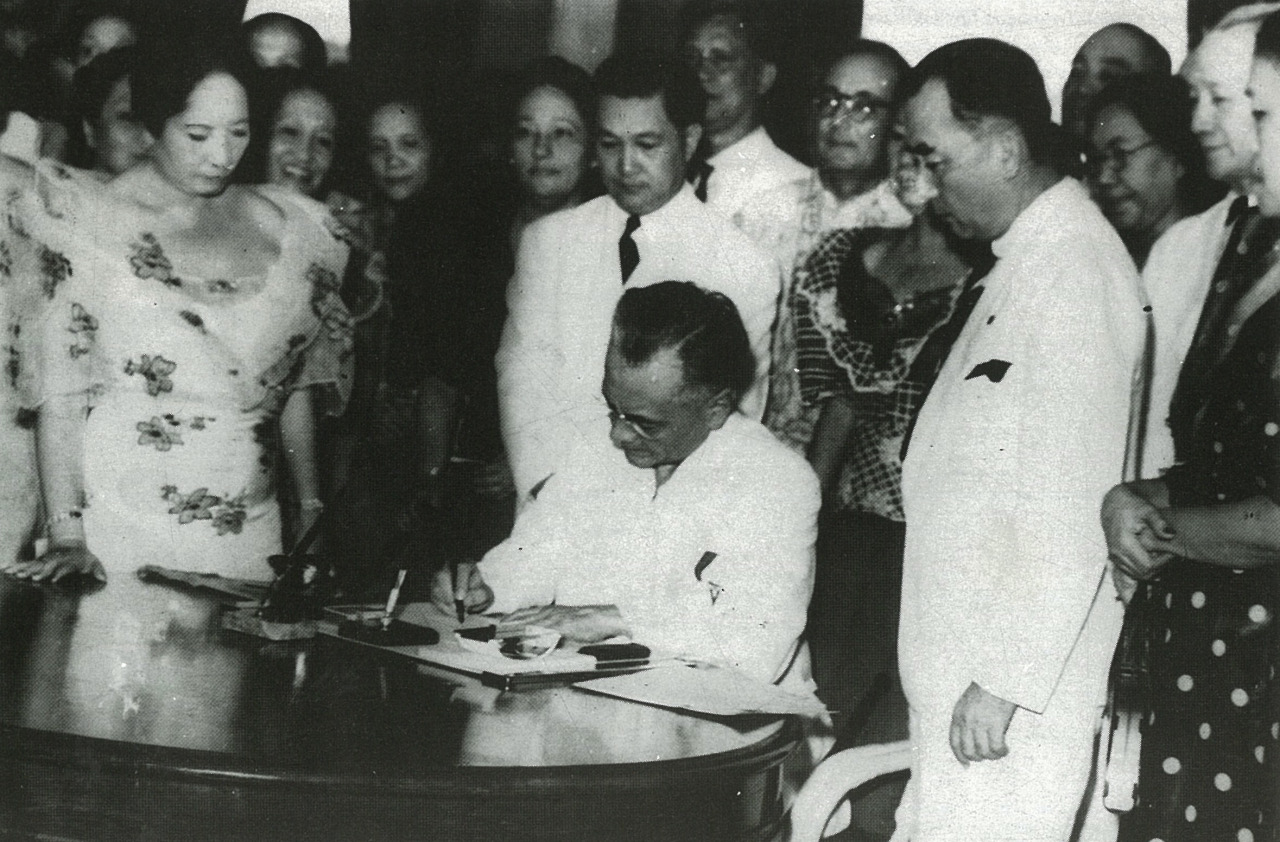
President Manuel L. Quezon signing the Women's Suffrage Bill following the 1937 plebiscite

The women's suffrage movement in the Philippines was one of the first, major occasions on which women grouped together politically. It was also one of the first women's rights movements, and endeavored to attain the right for women to vote and run for office. Many Filipino men were opposed to the idea, and held fast to the traditional view that a woman's place was cooking, cleaning and child rearing in the home. The men of this perspective were primarily concerned that the familial dynamic would destabilize if women were to formally step outside their customary role.

However, not all Filipino men were opposed to the movement. Congressman Filemon Sotto of Cebu filed the first women's suffrage bill at the 1907 Philippine Assembly. From there on, various suffrage bills were sponsored by a number of prominent men in society including; Assemblyman Melecio Severino of Negros Occidental in 1912, Mariano Cuenco of Cebu in 1916, and various assemblymen from Bulacan, Laguna and Tomas Luna in 1918. None of these bills succeeded. It was not until 1936 that the climate for women's suffrage shifted propitiously for women.

A Women's Citizens League was established in 1928 by the Women's Club of Manila. Led by Maria Ventura, its core aim at the outset was to support the cause of women's suffrage.

President Manuel L. Quezon declared his favour towards the suffragette movement in a speech delivered at Malacanang Palace in Manila on September 30, 1936. President Quezon, having signed the Woman's Suffrage Plebiscite Bill, held that, “…it is essential and even imperative that the right to vote be granted to Filipino women if they are not to be treated as mere slaves” and that, for women, it was “…their opportunity to wield a very important weapon to defend their right to secure for themselves and those to follow them their well-being and happiness.” Under the 1934 Constitution of the Philippines, Article V held that women were to gain suffrage provided 300,000 women would affirm the same desire at the ballot.

On September 17, 1937, women's suffrage was legalized in the Philippines, after the required threshold for the plebiscite of 300,000 was surpassed. 447,725 women affirmed their aspiration to vote, against 33,307 no votes. The Philippines was one of the first Asian countries to allow this right for women.

== Education ==
Society in the Philippines values education very highly, especially for their children. It is understood to be the means by which personal and familial poverty can be averted -allowing for a more successful way of life.

According to the Philippines's 2013 Census of Population and Housing, the literacy rate of the nation was recorded at 96.5%. It was also found that the literacy rate for females was 97% and males was 96.10%.

Tertiary education participation rates in the Philippines are among the highest in the world. The Honourable Patricia B. Licuanan, in her address at the United Nations in 2011, mentioned the high academic achievement of women, yet recognised their under-representation in some occupational fields. In areas such as engineering, technology, religion, law, trade and agriculture the graduates predominantly remain to be male. It has been hoped that this can be addressed through changes to school curriculum, educational classes based on the elimination of gender stereotypes and the boosting of general awareness of gender issues.

The former gap between male and female literacy and tertiary graduates no longer exists. Accessibility and attainment of education has been a major contributor to the general well-being and standard of living for not only all women, but all people, throughout the Philippines.

== Political participation ==
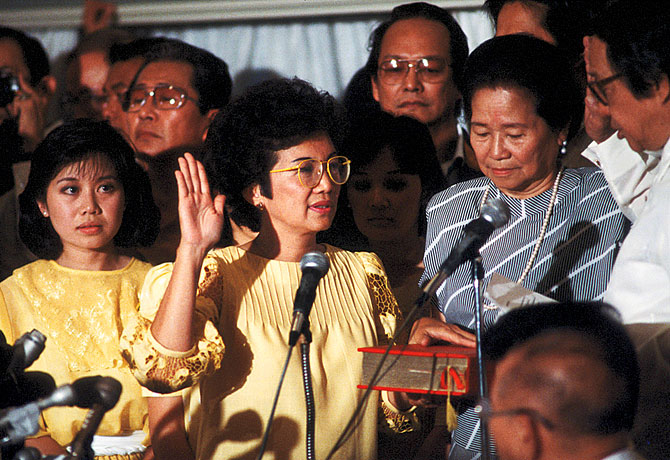
Corazon Aquino became the first female president of the Philippines in 1986

Gloria Macapagal Arroyo signing the Magna Carta of Women (Republic Act No. 9710)

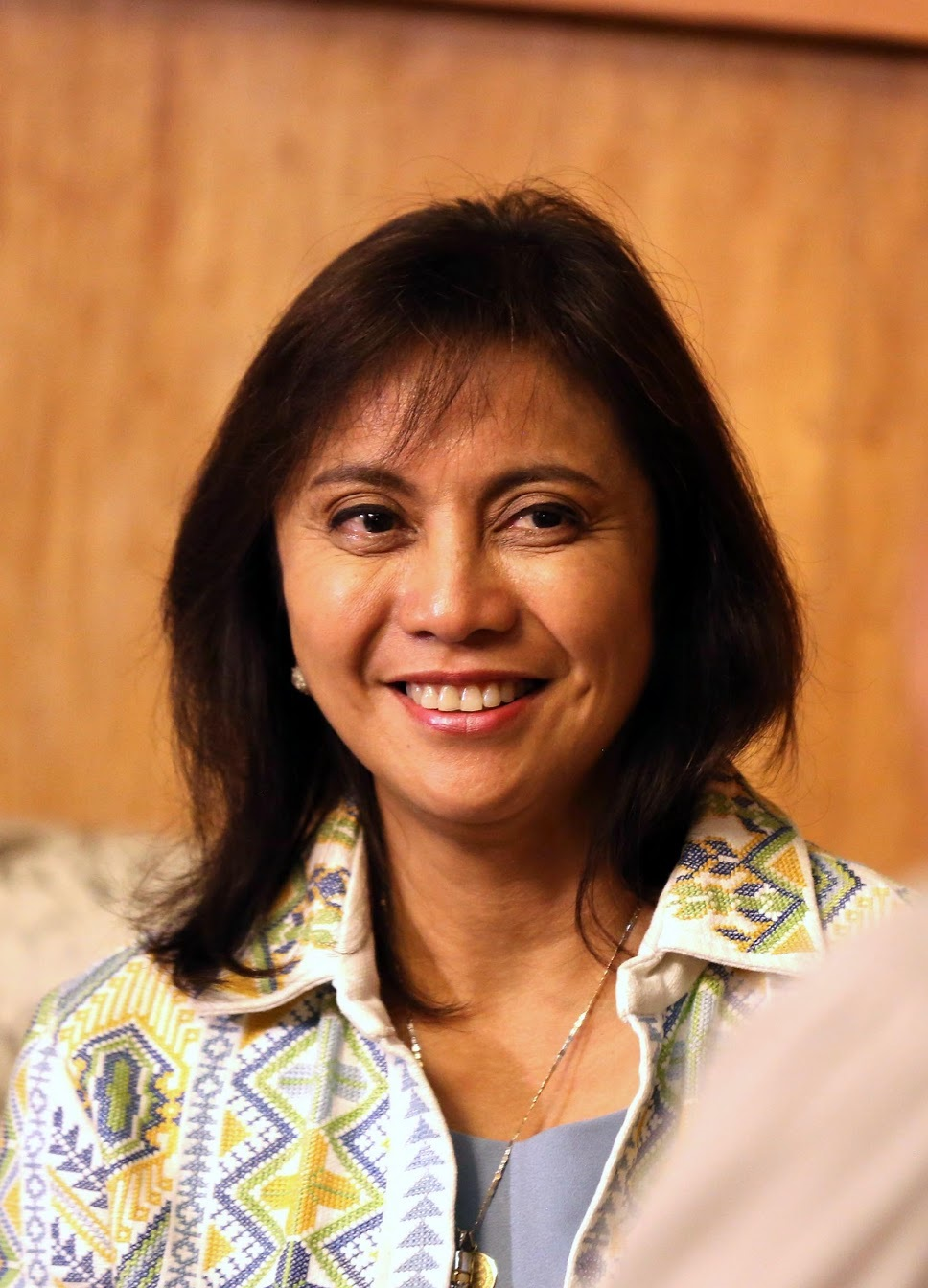
Leni Robredo is a former vice-president of the Philippines serving from 2016-2022

Filipino women have become increasingly involved in politics on both the local and national level. Scholars believe that the rise of women leaders can be largely attributed to familial connection and the support the Catholic Church gives to women. Women have come to occupy wide-ranging positions such as members of senate, members of congress, senators, governors, mayors and judges. The greatest exemplification of Filipino women’s involvement in politics are the occasions of female presidency. There have been several women who have run for presidency in the past, but since 1986 there have been two female presidents:

- Corazon Aquino was the eleventh president of the Republic of the Philippines and the first female president. Elected into office on February 25, 1986, Aquino restored democracy to the Philippines after the long dictatorship of Ferdinand Marcos. Aquino was named TIME magazine’s Woman of the Year in 1987.
- Gloria Macapagal Arroyo was the 14th president of the Republic of the Philippines and second female president. Antecedent to that, Arroyo had become the first female vice-president of the Philippines. Arroyo had already lived in the presidential palace before her presidency, because when she was 14 years-old her father, Diosdado Macapagal, became president of the Philippines.

According to the Republic of the Philippines Commission on Elections (COMELEC), the 2016 Certified List of Candidates for the position of President, two out of the six candidates were women:

- Miriam Defensor Santiago - Dr. Miriam Defensor Santiago served in all three branches of the Filipino government. She was a presiding judge of the Regional Trial Court (judicial), commissioner of the Bureau of Immigration and Deportation (executive, 1988), and a Senator (legislative, 1995-2001, 2004-2016). She earned her Doctorate of Juridical Science from the University of Michigan. She was chosen as laureate of the Magsaysay Award for Government Service in 1998. Dr. Santiago was elected as judge of the International Criminal Court in the United Nations (2011). Dr. Santiago ran for President in 1992, 1998, and 2016. During the 2016 Presidential campaign, she was the only candidate to favor divorce. Dr. Santiago died on September 29, 2016.
- Grace Poe is the second woman running for presidency in 2016. Poe's father ran for presidency in 2004 but was beaten by Gloria Macapagal-Arroyo. Poe has a successful political career behind her, having won a seat in senate through winning over 20 million more votes than Loren Legarda who won the previous two elections.

== Violence against women ==
Despite the comparatively advanced position of gender equality that the Philippines maintains, gender-based violence towards women, particularly domestic violence, remains a pervasive problem.

The Philippine Statistics Authority’s National Demographic and Health Survey 2013 revealed that:

- One in five women aged 15–49 had experienced physical violence since the age of 15 years old.
- One quarter of women ever-married aged 15–49, reported having experienced at any point emotional, physical, and/or sexual violence from their spouse.
- Of women who had experienced any form of physical or sexual violence, 30% of them sought help in response to that violence.
- While pregnant, 4% of women aged 15–49 experienced violence.

The PSA’s National Demographic and Health Survey 2022 found that 17.5 % of Filipino women ages 15-49 have experienced physical, sexual or emotional violence from their intimate partners. The 2021 survey also revealed 8,399 reported cases of physical violence, composed of 1,791 rape and 1,505 acts of lasciviousness.

Many significant laws have been enacted directly addressing this issue. These include the Anti-Violence Against Women and Their Children Act (Republic Act (RA) 9262), the Anti-Rape Law (RA 8353), the Rape-Victim Assistance and Protection Act (RA 8505), the Anti-Sexual Harassment Law (RA 7877), the Anti-Trafficking of Persons Act 2003 (RA 9208) and many more. Despite these initiatives, there is increasing recognition that the incongruence between the laws and its effect is due to little or ineffective implementation.

In striving towards successful implementation of the law to help eliminate violence against women, a multitude of governmental, charitable and religious organisations offer their services by taking in and caring for women; as well as promoting public awareness on the subject. The Philippine Commission on Women draws attention to various centers and programs that work to alleviate violence against women. These include women's crisis facilities, domestic violence phone helplines and the Department of Social Welfare and Development’s Crisis Intervention Unit.

== Reproductive rights ==
In the Philippines, abortion has been illegal and criminalized for over a century. This is mainly due to Spanish colonial-era influences in Filipino life, notably Catholicism.

It is under the Penal Code 1870 that abortion was first criminalized, and from there the Revised Penal Code 1930 adapted the same criminalizing law. Under the Revised Penal Code, midwives and physicians who have carried out abortions could face imprisonment for six years –even if they had the consent of the pregnant woman. Due to the lack of exceptions in this area, women can also face imprisonment for a sentence between two and six years for having an abortion.

In the 1987 Philippine Constitution, Article II mentions the importance of the sanctity of family life. Section 12 elaborates on this holding that, “It [the State] shall equally protect the life of the mother and the life of the unborn from conception.”

Pregnant women who want abortions, generally have to seek them clandestinely. Some women have even deliberately conducted themselves in such a way as to bring about miscarriage. Those women who have received proper treatment for their health complications due to abortion procedure have often felt stigmatized by those treating them.

Despite the law on abortion currently standing unaltered, debate over change is ongoing. At present, a woman who has been raped cannot undergo abortion due to Article II. However, in cases where the life of the mother is threatened by the pregnancy, a doctor may let the spouse to choose between the life of the unborn child or the mother.

== Constitutional Protections ==
The Philippines has many constitutional and legislative protections for women; particularly in the area of violence against women. Some of these include or are included in;

- The 1987 Philippine Constitution in article II, section 14 maintains that the State, "recognizes the role of women in nation building and shall ensure the fundamental equality before the law of women and men."
- The Revised Penal code of the Philippines, Republic Act No. 3815. Article 245 of the Act holds that where any police officer or warden immorally or indecently advances to a woman under his watch, that officer or warden will be charged and could face suspension or disqualification of his post.
- The Republic Act No. 7877, also known as the Anti-Sexual Harassment Act of 1995. This Act applies to all persons, but at the same time offers particularly progressive provisions for the protection of women and children who are particularly vulnerable in this area. This Act declares the unlawfulness of sexual harassment in employment, education and training environments.
- The Republic Act No. 9710, also known as the Magna Carta of Women of 2009. Section 2 of the Act holds that, "the state realizes the equality of men and women entails the abolition of the unequal structures and practices that perpetuate discrimination and inequality." It goes on to state that the realization of this can be achieved through appropriate plans, policies, mechanisms, and so forth, to achieve equality and freedom from sex-based discrimination.
- The Republic Act 10354, also known as the Responsible Parenthood and Reproductive Health Act of 2012. Section 2 holds and emphasizes the importance of the equal protection of both the lives of women and the lives of unborn women from conception. It goes onto recognize and guarantee the promotion of gender equality and equity, women's empowerment and that the dignity of health be classified as a human rights concern and social responsibility.

== See also ==
- Women in the Philippines
- National Commission on the Role of Filipino Women
- Violence against women in the Philippines
