= Crime in the Philippines =

Crime in Philippines
- Homicide: 4.3 (2024)
- Assault: 0.7 (2023)
- Theft: 23.7 (2018)
- Rape: 1.2 (2023)
- Sexual violence: 1.8 (2012)
- reported per 100,000 inhabitants

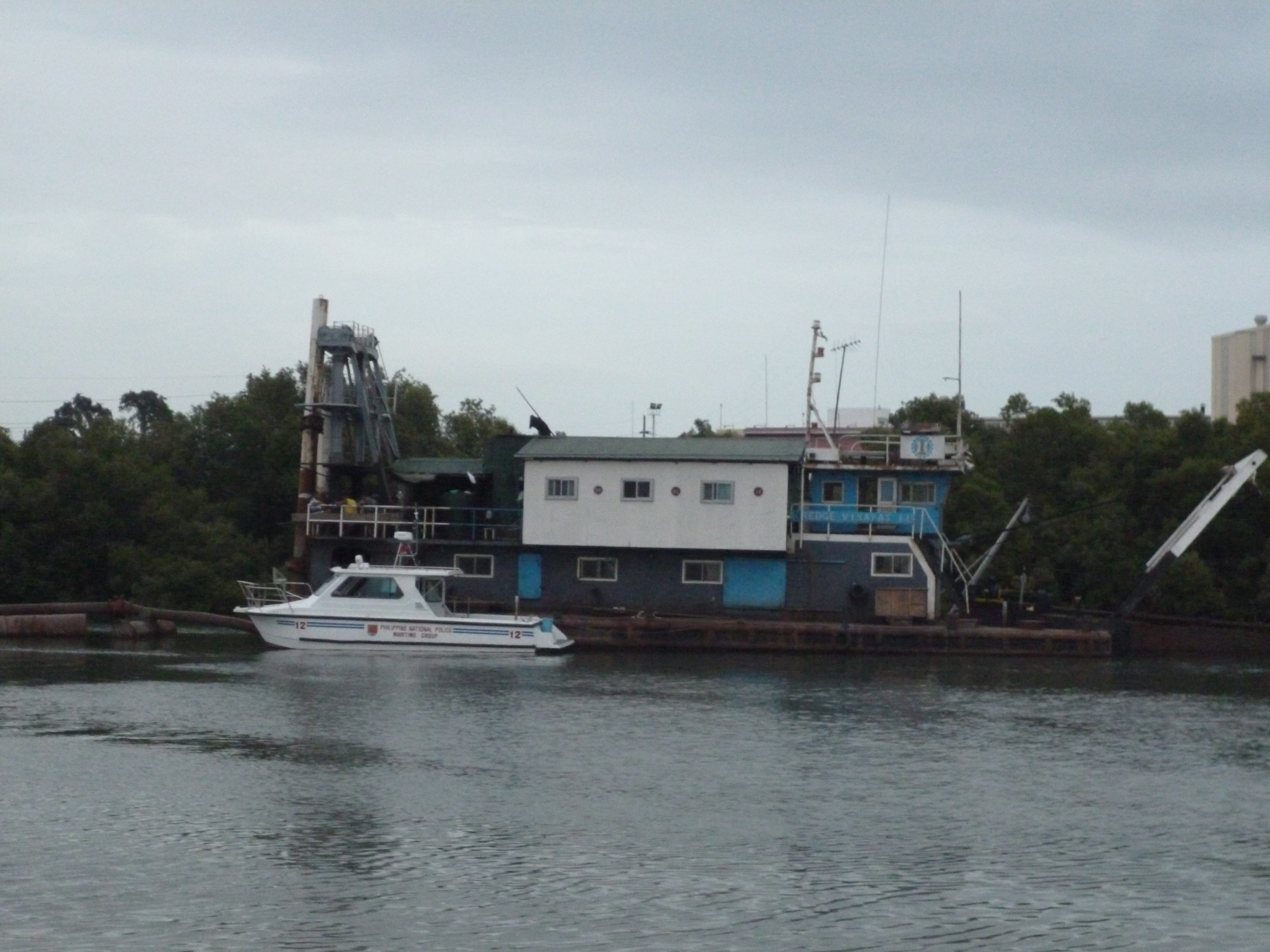
A boat belonging to the Philippine National Police at the Iloilo River in Iloilo City

Crime is present in various forms in the Philippines, and remains a serious issue throughout the country. Illegal drug trade, human trafficking, arms trafficking, murder, corruption and domestic violence remain significant concerns.

== Crime by type ==
=== Murder ===
In 2014, the Philippines had a murder rate of 9.84 per 100,000 people, with a number of 9,784 recorded cases. The country also has the highest rate of murder cases in Southeast Asia in 2013, with a rate of 8.8, followed by Thailand. The murder rate in the Philippines reached its peak in 2002 and 2010, with rates of 8.1 (6,553 cases) and 9.5 (8,894 cases).

=== Organized crime ===
Organized crime in the Philippines can be linked to certain families or barkadas (groups) who perpetrate crimes ranging from extortion, sale of illegal narcotics and loan sharking to robbery, kidnapping, and murder-for-hire.

==== Illegal drug trade ====
Illegal drug trade is a major concern in the Philippines. Meth ("shabu") and marijuana, are the most common drugs accounting most drug-related arrests. Most of the illegal drug trade involved members of large Chinese triad groups operating in the Philippines, owing to its location on drug smuggling routes.

The Philippine law enforcement agencies face challenges in combating drug trafficking due to insufficient resources, limited investigative tools, and legal restrictions. The Anti-Wiretapping Act of 1965 hinders the use of surveillance, and plea bargaining and asset forfeiture are rarely utilized. Additionally, strict evidence procedures often lead to case dismissals. Despite proposed reforms, legal delays persist, hindering effective prosecution and adjudication of drug-related cases.

During the term of Philippine president Rodrigo Duterte, he initiated his controversial "war on drugs". This campaign has led to the deaths of more than 12,000 Filipinos over which 2,555 of the killings were attributed to the Philippine National Police. In September 2021, the International Criminal Court (ICC) authorized an official investigation on Duterte's anti-drug campaign.

=== Petty crime ===
Petty crime, which includes pick-pocketing, is a problem in the Philippines. It takes place usually in locations with many people, ranging from shopping hubs to churches. Traveling alone to withdraw cash after dark is a risk, especially for foreigners.

=== Rape ===
Rape in the Philippines is considered a criminal offense. In Philippine jurisprudence, it is a heinous crime punishable by reclusión perpetua when committed against women. Rape of males is also legally recognized as rape by sexual assault, which is penalized by imprisonment of six to twelve years.

=== Domestic violence ===
Violence against women in the Philippines includes different forms of gender-based violence. The term "violence against women" is "the word or concept (that) has been used in a broad, inclusive manner to encompass verbal abuse, intimidation, physical harassment, homicide, sexual assault, and rape." This form of violence is gender-biased. Violence occurs precisely because of their gender, specifically because the victims are women.

According to the 2017 National Demographic and Health Survey in the Philippines, one in every four (or 26%) ever-married women aged 15–49 had ever experienced physical, sexual or emotional violence by their husband or partner. Additionally, one in five (20%) women had reported ever experiencing emotional violence, 14% had ever experienced physical violence, and 5% had ever experienced sexual violence by their current or most recent husband or partner.

==== Child abuse ====
The COVID-19 pandemic has led to a significant increase in child abuse in the Philippines. The study "The Hidden Impact of COVID-19 on Children" reported a 32% increase in household violence within the country, particularly in households with decreased income. Additionally, in 2021 from a high-level dialogue between the Philippine government and UNICEF, the Office of Cybercrime from the Department of Justice noted a 260% increase in online child abuse reports in the Philippines during the pandemic. This alarming trend, is often linked to job loss, financial stress, and increased time spent at home, leading to cases of parents abusing their children and even livestreaming the abuse.

=== Human trafficking ===
Human trafficking and the prostitution of children is a significant issue in the Philippines, often controlled by organized crime syndicates. Human trafficking in the country is a crime against humanity.

In an effort to deal with the problem, the Philippines passed Republic Act (R.A.) 9208, the Anti-Trafficking in Persons Act of 2003, a penal law against human trafficking, sex tourism, sex slavery and child prostitution. Nevertheless, enforcement is reported to be inconsistent. While the 2003 and 2012 anti-trafficking laws criminalize sex and labor trafficking with penalties of up to 20 years imprisonment and significant fines (between 1 million and 2 million Philippine pesos), the government's enforcement efforts have weakened due to the challenges of the COVID-19 pandemic.

==== Prostitution ====
Prostitution in the Philippines is illegal. It is a serious crime with penalties ranging up to life imprisonment for those involved in trafficking. It is covered by the Anti-Trafficking in Persons Act. Prostitution is still sometimes illegally available through brothels (also known as casa), bars, karaoke bars, massage parlors, street walkers and escort services. As of 2009, one source estimates that there are 800,000 women working as prostitutes in the Philippines, with some of them believed to be underage. While victims are largely female, and according to the current Revised Penal Code, there are in fact a small minority of them who are male.

=== Corruption and police misconduct ===
Corruption is a major problem in the Philippines. In 2013, during the country's elections, some 504 political candidates were accused mostly of corruption and some of violent crimes.

== Gangs ==
Notable criminally-active gangs in the Philippines include:

- Temple Street (gang)
- Bahala Na Gang
- True Brown Style
- Budol-Budol Gang
- Dugo-Dugo Gang
- Kuratong Baleleng
- Martilyo Gang
- Salisi Gang
- Zesto Gang
- Satanas (gang)
- Sigue Sigue Sputnik
- Waray-Waray gangs

Some operating in the Philippines were internationally known youth criminal gangs, mostly from the United States such as the True Brown Style, Creeps, and the Reckless Asiatic Gangsta.

=== Incidents ===
As of 2009, the Presidential Anti-Organized Crime Division (PAOCC) had noted 233 criminal gangs operating in Metro Manila alone. In the third quarter of 2008, there had been 79 crimes in Manila attributed to these gangs ranging from robbery to murder.

==== Appearances in prisons ====
In 1968, a Senate Committee Report listed twelve gangs in New Bilibid Prison, linked to regional ties and conflicts among inmates. In 1989, a major violence occurred between the Bahala Na Gang and the Happy Go Lucky Gang, resulting in deaths and multiple injuries on some guards and several inmates. As of 2011, there had been media investigations pointing out the appearances of gangs in Philippine prisons resulting in public outrage. By mid-2016, the Duterte administration had imposed stricter visitation policies.

==== 2025–2026 Philippine anti-corruption protests ====
In September 2025, there had been several reports of youth gangs hijacking peaceful flood scandal protests and looting businesses in Recto Avenue.

=== Government response ===
Under the Juvenile Justice Law or Republic Act 9344, children ages 15 and younger are exempt from criminal charges while youth ages 15 to 18 can be charged only with discernment. The Philippine National Police expressed that criminal gangs had use minors for illegal actions while acknowledging other factors such as domestic neglect from parents. During the presidency of Rodrigo Duterte, the police were given "shoot to kill" orders for organized criminals who resisted arrest. Most of the victims of these orders were young men from impoverished backgrounds. In June 2025, Valenzuela City declared 13 street gangs as persona non grata with some gangs having links to illegal drug trade.
