= National Commission on Muslim Filipinos =

Philippine government agency

- Pambansang Komisyon sa mga Pilipinong Muslim اللجنة الوطنية لمسلمي الفلبيني
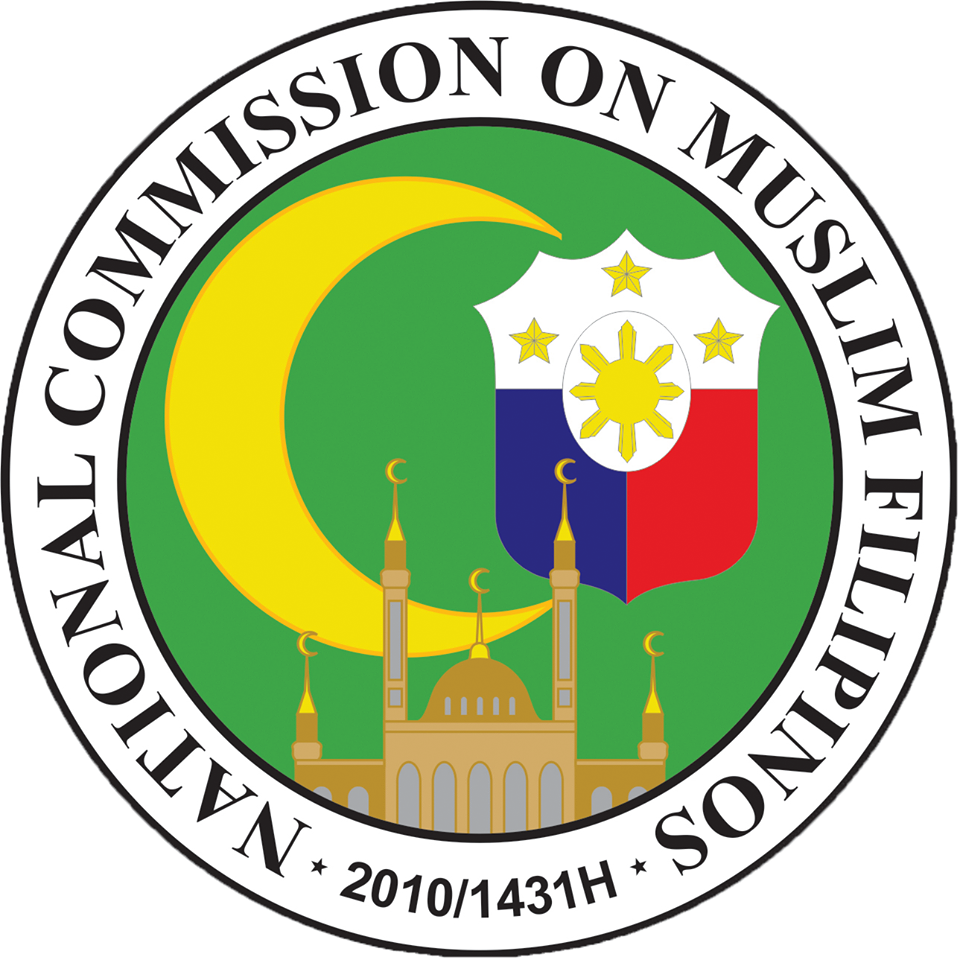

Agency overview
- Formed: 18 February 2010; 16 years ago
- Preceding agency: Office on Muslim Affairs
- Jurisdiction: Government of the Philippines
- Headquarters: 79 Jocfer Annex Bldg., Commonwealth Avenue, Quezon City, Philippines
- Employees: 866 (2024)
- Annual budget: ₱759.67 million (2023)
- Agency executives: Sabuddin N. Abdurahim, Chairman and Secretary; Tahir S. Lidasan Jr., CESO II, Executive Director; Atty. Hassanal H. Abdurahim, Chief of Staff
- Parent agency: Department of the Interior and Local Government
- Website: ncmf.gov.ph

The National Commission on Muslim Filipinos (NCMF; Filipino: Pambansang Komisyon sa mga Pilipinong Muslim; Arabic: اللجنة الوطنية لمسلمي الفلبين, romanized: al-Lajnat al-Wataniat li-Muslimi al-Filibiyn) is a government agency in the Philippines, whose objective is to promote the rights of Muslim Filipinos and to make them active participants in Philippine nation-building.

NCMF was one of the 12 agencies, formerly from the Office of the President which was placed under the supervision of the Cabinet Secretary, based on Executive Order No. 1 issued by President Rodrigo Duterte on July 4, 2016. On October 31, 2018, the Commission, through Executive Order No. 67, was again transferred to the Department of the Interior and Local Government along with the National Youth Commission and the Philippine Commission on Women as part of the reorganization of the Office of the Cabinet Secretary.

== History ==
On July 23, 1979, President Ferdinand Marcos signed Executive Order No. 549 creating the Office of the Commissioner for Islamic Affairs. Rear Admiral Romulo Espaldon was appointed as commissioner and Michael Mastura as deputy commissioner.

On May 28, 1981, the Office of the Commissioner for Islamic Affairs was abolished and replaced with the Ministry of Muslim Affairs by virtue of Executive Order No. 697 with Espaldon as Minister and Mastura as Deputy Minister. Under his leadership, the Philippine Shari'ah Institute was launched and spearheaded the translation of the Code of Muslim Personal Laws from English to Arabic, and the first Madrasa policy conference was held to discuss the integration of Madrasa-type education into the Philippine Educational System.

Two months later, the Ministry was renamed Office of Muslim Affairs in order to minimize the number of ministries (25 at the time) and simplify the management of government. Other ministries that were reclassified as offices were the Ministry of Budget and Ministry of Public Information.

On June 30, 1984, the Office of Muslim Affairs was merged with the Office of the Presidential Assistant on National Minorities (PANAMIN) to form the Office of Muslim Affairs and Cultural Communities (OMACC). It was first headed by Director General Simeon Datumanong and later by Candu Muarip.

On January 30, 1987, President Corazon Aquino divided the OMACC into three distinct and separate offices: the Office for the Muslim Affairs (OMA), the Office for Northern Cultural Communities (ONCC), and the Office for Southern Cultural Communities (OSCC). The OMA was first headed by Executive Director Jiamil Dianalan and later by Dimasangcay Pundato.

On February 18, 2010, Congress enacted Republic Act No. 9997 which abolished the OMA and created the National Commission on Muslim Filipinos. It was first headed by Bai Omera Dianalan-Lucman.

== Major development programs ==
Pursuant to its mandate, the NCMF is pursuing the following major development programs:

- Coordination with other Muslim countries;
- Coordination, supervision and administration of pilgrimage;
- Implementation of socioeconomic and cultural development programs;
- Institutional support to Qu’ran reading competitions;
- Promotion and development of Muslim economic affairs;
- Promotion and development of Muslim settlements;
- Promotion, development and enhancement of Muslim culture and institutions;
- Rehabilitation of rebel returnees;
- Support services program;
- Support to Madrasa education; and
- Support to Shari’ah project implementation.

== Composition ==
The main difference between the Commission and its predecessor is its composition: the Office on Muslim Affairs was headed by three Directors, who were appointed by the President. The nine members of the new Commission are still appointed by the President. All of them, however, must be Muslim Filipinos; one female, one a religious leader, the other five each from a different tribe. These provisions aim to represent the whole of the Muslim Filipino community equitably in the Commission. The members hold office for six years, the position of chairman changes biannually, so as to prevent any single tribe from gaining a dominant position in the Commission.

== Board of Commissioners ==
The Commission consists of a 9-member body, consisting of 8 Commissioners and the Secretary:

- Secretary/Chairman: Sabuddin N. Abdurahim

Members of the Commission:

- Baicon B. Cayongcat-Nuska
- Dr. Abunnapis O. Abdulmajid, SCL
- Abdulkhabir I. Musa
- Sultan Sambitory O. Dimaporo
- Atty. Syed Kamal Reza L. Ampatuan
- Atty. Hussin U. Amin
- Usop Z. Casan
- Commissioner representing Women Sector (Vacant)

== Bureaus ==
The Commission also consists of specialized Bureaus and Departments:

- Administrative Service (headed by Director Gary A. Habibon, DPA)
- Bureau of External Relations (headed by Acting Director Sajid A. Ensamtan)
- Bureau of Legal Affairs (headed by Director Atty. Rolando T. Abo)
- Bureau of Muslim Cultural Affairs (headed by Director Arch. Benrajiv J. Kashim)
- Bureau of Muslim Economic Affairs (headed by Director Saleha P. Sacar)
- Bureau of Muslim Settlements (headed by Director Cosanie M. Derogongan)
- Bureau of Peace & Conflict Resolution (headed by Director Sultan Masideng M. Salic)
- Bureau of Pilgrimage and Endowment (headed by Director Zainoden M. Usudan)
- Finance and Management Service (headed by Director Atty. Mudzmar A. Muyong)
- Planning Service (headed by Director Haidee V. Ampatuan, MNSA)

== Functions ==
Pursuant to Republic Act 9997, the Commission fulfills several functions:

- Advising and assisting the President on issues affecting the Muslim Filipino community;
- Being the primary agency through which Muslims can seek government assistance or redress;
- Prescribing rules for the establishment of awqaf;
- Promoting and organizing the annual Hajj;
- Promoting and supervising the Madrasa education system;
- Providing legal assistance; and
- Providing scholarships.
