= Gender inequality in the Philippines =

Ensuring gender equality is vital for sustainable economic progress and development, as it guarantees that men and women alike can access education, employment, and leadership opportunities. Closing the gender gap is both an ethical obligation and a strategic economic decision. In the Philippines, although the country has narrowed the gender gap in education and political representation, substantial disparities remain in women’s economic participation and leadership roles.

== Overview ==
The Philippines has been recognized as one of the leading countries in Asia in terms of gender equality. According to the 2025 Insight from the Global Gender Gap Report of the World Economic Forum the Philippines ranked 20th out of 148 countries, with a gender parity score of 78.1%. This reflects significant progress in areas such as education, economic participation, and political empowerment. Women in the Philippines have historically played prominent roles in society, from pre-colonial matriarchal structures to modern political leadership. The country has had two female presidents: Corazon Aquino and Gloria Macapagal Arroyo and maintains relatively high female representation in parliament and local governance. The 2009 Magna Carta of Women institutionalized gender equality as a national priority, mandating the integration of gender perspectives in policy-making and public service delivery. However, despite these achievements, Filipino women continue to face systemic challenges, including gender-based violence, economic vulnerability, and underrepresentation in leadership roles.

Historically, the Philippines maintained a strong standing in gender equality, ranking in the Top 10 for 13 consecutive years from 2006 to 2018, before slipping to 16th place in 2019.

== Early Movement Towards Gender Equality in the Philippines ==
The women's movement in the Philippines traces its roots to the anti-colonial resistance of the late 1800s, notably with the founding of the women's wing of the Katipunan in 1893. Even earlier, Filipino women had already begun asserting their rights—such as the cigarreras strike in 1816 and the 1888 campaign for education led by the "20 women of Malolos." Under Spanish colonial rule, a deeply patriarchal system emerged, subjecting women to discrimination shaped by gender, social class, religion, and ethnicity. While middle-class women protested limited access to education, working-class women endured exploitative labor conditions and wage inequality. The Katipunan’s establishment in 1892 was a turning point, not only for the revolution but also for women’s active involvement in the fight for independence. In 1905, Concepcion Felix founded the Asociacion Feminista Filipina, which was considered as the country’s first feminist organization that focused on social welfare and encouraging women’s civic participation. A year later, Pura Villanueva Kalaw launched the Asociacion Feminista Ilonga, which became the first group to champion women's suffrage. These pioneering organizations laid the groundwork for Filipino women's right to vote and hold public office. Between 1905 and 1937, women continued to face formidable obstacles. During the American colonial period, women from the middle and upper classes pushed for reforms in politics and society, while those from marginalized communities sustained armed resistance against foreign rule, a struggle that persisted even through the Second World War.

== Philippine Gender-Based Laws and Policies ==
On January 7, 1975, during the Martial Law period, the Philippine government enacted Presidential Decree No. 633, establishing the National Commission on the Role of Filipino Women (NCRFW). This move was in response to the United Nations General Assembly’s declaration of 1975 as International Women’s Year, centered on the theme “equality, development, and peace.” The NCRFW was created to:

- advise the President on policies and programs that promote women’s participation in national development
- safeguard and enhance the cultural and traditional achievements of Filipino women amid modernization
- monitor and assess the integration of women into all sectors of society on equal footing with men
- recommend measures to ensure legal equality between women and men in areas where disparities exist
- develop and implement a nationwide program for International Women’s Year

Then First Lady Imelda Marcos served as the Commission’s first Chairperson.

Later, the 1987 Constitution of the Philippines reinforced gender equality and the role of women in society through key provisions:

Article II, Section 14: Recognizes women’s role in nation-building and guarantees equal legal rights for both sexes

Article XIII, Section 11: Mandates a comprehensive health strategy prioritizing vulnerable groups, including women and children, and aims to provide free medical care to the impoverished

Article XIII, Section 14: Ensures protection for working women by promoting safe workplaces, acknowledging maternal roles, and offering support systems to help them reach their full potential in national service

On February 17, 1989, President Corazon Aquino, the first female head of state in the Philippines, enacted Executive Order No. 348, launching the Philippine Development Plan for Women covering the years 1989 to 1992.

Later, on February 12, 1992, Republic Act No. 7192—known as the Women in Development and Nation Building Act—was signed into law. This legislation mandated that 5% to 30% of Overseas Development Assistance (ODA) be allocated to Gender and Development (GAD) initiatives. It also required government agencies receiving ODA to ensure these funds are used for gender-responsive programs that align with national GAD efforts, and to submit annual reports on their progress to the National Economic and Development Authority (NEDA) and the National Commission on the Role of Filipino Women (NCRFW).

In 1995, the Gender and Development (GAD) budget policy was formally introduced through the General Appropriations Act (GAA), commonly referred to as “The Women’s Budget.” This initiative aimed to allocate tangible resources for implementing gender-focused programs and projects, emphasizing advocacy and the empowerment of women. Under this policy, all government agencies and departments were mandated to dedicate at least five percent of their annual budgets to gender-related activities and initiatives. Over time, this provision became a consistent element of the yearly GAA and was further reinforced by the enactment of the Magna Carta of Women (MCW).

Additionally, on September 8, 1995, Executive Order No. 273 was issued during the administration of President Fidel V. Ramos, establishing the Philippine Plan for Gender and Development (PPGD) 1995–2025—a comprehensive national framework aimed at achieving full gender equality and inclusive development for both women and men.

On March 8, 2004, the landmark law of Republic Act No. 9262 also known as the Anti-Violence Against Women and Their Children Act (VAWC) of 2004, was enacted into law. It aims to address and penalize various forms of abuse committed against women and their children, particularly within intimate relationships. The law was signed to reflect the country’s commitment to uphold human rights and gender equality. The law defines violence against women and their children (VAWC) as any act or series of acts committed by a person against a woman who is: 1) His wife or former wife, 2) A woman with whom he has or had a sexual or dating relationship, and 3) a woman with whom he shares a child. The law also protects the woman’s children, whether legitimate or illegitimate, from abuse committed within or outside the family abode. RA No. 9262 recognizes that abuse can take many forms, including: physical violence, sexual violence, psychological violence, economic violence, and digital violence.

On August 14, 2009, President Gloria Macapagal Arroyo —the country’s second female leader—enacted Republic Act No. 9710, known as the Magna Carta of Women, to finally secure equal rights for Filipino women and abolish all forms of gender discrimination. This sweeping law brings together existing human rights statutes designed to protect women, and it transforms the National Commission on the Role of Filipino Women into the Philippine Commission on Women (PCW). With the Department of Budget and Management’s guidance, the PCW’s powers were broadened and its organizational structure and staffing realigned to fulfill its new responsibilities.

== See also ==
- Philippine Commission on Women
- Women in the Philippines
- Violence against women in the Philippines
- Women in Asia
- Feminism
