= Dimasangcay Pundato =

Filipino politician (1947–2020)

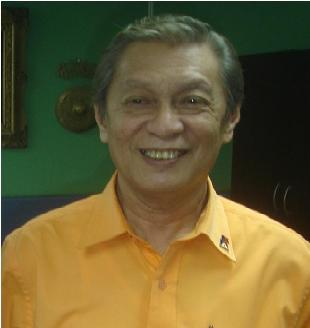
- Pundato in 2011
- Born: December 21, 1947; Dansalan, Lanao, Philippines
- Died: August 13, 2020 (aged 72); Marawi, Lanao del Sur, Philippines
- Citizenship: Filipino
- Education: University of Manila; Jamiatul Philippines Al-Islamiyyah
- Spouse: Naima Macapundag-Pundato
- Military career
- Allegiance: MNLF; MNLF Reformist Group
- Service years: 1973-1980 (MNLF); 1980-1985 (MNLF-RG)

Dimasangcay Pundato (December 21, 1947 – August 13, 2020) a Muslim Filipino of Maranao descent, known to friends and kin as "Kumander Dimas", was former Moro revolutionary leader and undersecretary of the Office of the Presidential Adviser on the Peace Process. He served for nine years in the now-defunct Office on Muslim Affairs (OMA) under the Office of the President during the administrations of the late President Cory Aquino and former President Fidel V. Ramos. He was Vice Chairman of the Moro National Liberation Front (MNLF) and Chairman of the MNLF Reformist Group, where he negotiated with the Ramos administration in peace talks with Moro rebel front leaders.

== Career ==
=== Moro National Liberation Front ===
In the fight against the dictatorship of President Ferdinand Marcos, Pundato led the Maranao forces of the MNLF from 1973 to 1985, eventually becoming MNLF Vice-Chairman in 1978. He also fought internally for reforms in the rebel movement. Among the three pillars of the MNLF, Pundato, the new Chairman of the MNLF Reformist Group became the only one actively engaged in the fighting on the ground while the rest were staying abroad and managing their forces literally by remote control. In 1980 he severed his relations with MNLF Chairman Nur Misuari when the latter refused the reforms demanded by Pundato of the organization with allegations of ideological differences and a leadership style tilting MNLF to one-man rule. This led to the creation of the MNLF Reformist Group which he headed.

=== As government official and the Mindanao Peace Process ===
Pundato, in his long stint in the government, lasting 5 different administrations, was appointed by President Corazon Aquino as Executive Director of the Office on Muslim Affairs, where he would serve for 9 years and the entirety of the Ramos Administration and up until the administration of Joseph Estrada. During his time with the Office on Muslim Affairs, he would become popular within government circles for his transparency as an Executive Head, and his work prioritizing development management and resource mobilization programs in Muslim constituencies. During the Arroyo administration he was appointed Assistant Secretary, and later Undersecretary for the Office of the Presidential Adviser on Peace Process (OPAPP) with a focus on peace-talk deliberations, conflict resolution, and mediation with Moro revolutionary groups.

=== Self-exile and opposition to President Marcos ===
During self-exile, Pundato and the MNLF Reformist Group met with President Aquino's late father, the Senator Benigno S. Aquino Jr. in Kuala Lumpur. Believing in the reforms that Senator Ninoy fought for against Marcos, Pundato and the MNLF Reformist Group helped to fight Marcos' dictatorship. But even then after the death of Senator Ninoy on August 21, 1983, in continuing their support for his dreams for the country, one year before the historic EDSA People Power Revolt, Pundato and the MNLF Reformist Group signalled support and political cooperation with the Ninoy Aquino Movement in San Francisco, California and in the country. As a gesture, President Cory Aquino in 1986, tasked former Senator Aquilino "Nene" Pimentel, currently the DILG Secretary to convince Pundato in Kuala Lumpur to return and be part of her government. Pundato then told Secretary Pimentel to first convince other Moro rebel leaders, such as Misuari and Salamat if they would accede to the peace negotiations since he and his reformist group agreed not to become an obstacle to peace but was bent on heeding Cory Aquino's call for national peace and reconciliation.

Christopher and Ramon Carreon became instrumental in the back channeling for the peaceful return of Pundato to the Philippines. Early in 1987, Ambassador Pelaez and Ambassador Mauyag Tamano, convinced Pundato in Kuala Lumpur to return to the Philippines without any demands and conditions when he joined the government to support the return of Philippine democracy under the stewardship of then newly installed President Corazon Aquino, then mother of young Noynoy Aquino. As a regular Resource Person to the Peace Commission of Ambassador Pelaez he closely watched the Regional Consultative Commission in drafting the Organic Act of the Autonomous Region for Muslim Mindanao. From 1988 to 1998 Pundato was appointed Executive Director of the Office on Muslim Affairs where he had successfully institutionalized a system for running and managing the annual pilgrimage to Mecca Saudi Arabia. Among the innovations he introduced were: getting the lowest rates for the fare and quality accommodations in Saudi Arabia; Pundato was able to forge a strong relationship and raised the credibility of the Filipino Muslims with Muasasa or Hadz Establishment in charge of Southeast Asian Muslims.

=== Death ===
Pundato died at his residence in Marawi on August 13, 2020, at the age of 72.
