= Rape in the Philippines =

Sexual violence in the Philippines

Rape in the Philippines is considered a criminal offense. In Philippine jurisprudence, it is a heinous crime punishable by reclusión perpetua when committed against women. Rape of males is also legally recognized as rape by sexual assault, which is penalized by imprisonment of six to twelve years.

== Law ==
As of 2022, the crime of rape was classified as a Crime against persons and was defined as follows:

Article 266-A. Rape; When and How Committed. - Rape is committed:

1) By a person who shall have carnal knowledge of another person under any of the following circumstances:

a) Through force, threat, or intimidation;
b) When the offended party is deprived of reason or otherwise unconscious;
c) By means of fraudulent machination or grave abuse of authority; and
d) When the offended party is under sixteen (16) years of age or is demented, even though none of the circumstances mentioned above be present: Provided, That there shall be no criminal liability on the part of a person having carnal knowledge of another person sixteen (16) years of age when the age difference between the parties is not more than three (3) years, and the sexual act in question is proven to be consensual, non-abusive, and non-exploitative: Provided, further, That if the victim is under thirteen (13) years of age, this exception shall not apply.

As used in this Act, non-abusive shall mean the absence of undue influence, intimidation, fraudulent machinations, coercion, threat, physical, sexual, psychological, or mental injury or maltreatment, either with intention or through neglect, during the conduct of sexual activities with the child victim. On the other hand, non-exploitative shall mean there is no actual or attempted act or acts of unfairly taking advantage of the child's position of vulnerability, differential power, or trust during the conduct of sexual activities.

2) By any person who, under any of the circumstances mentioned in paragraph 1 hereof, shall commit an act of sexual assault by inserting his penis into another person’s mouth or anal orifice, or any instrument or object, into the genital or anal orifice of another person..

The María Clara doctrine is a relevant legal doctrine that observed by Philippine courts on abuse on women, including rape. It states that women, especially Filipino women, "would not admit that they have been abused unless that abuse had actually happened." and that a women's natural instinct is to protect their honor. Though in 2018, a ruling which convicted two men for rape of a woman in Davao City was reversed by the Supreme Court's Third Division due to inconsistencies with the woman's statement in regards to her alleged rape and other evidences presented to the court. However this did not mean the abandonment of the doctrine contrary to speculations by critics of the ruling.

Since rape is punishable by reclusión perpetua, Article 90 of the Revised Penal Code provides a statute of limitations of 20 years from the date of its commission.

== Statistics ==
Statistics on the incidence of rape are usually based on available police records. Cases of rape in the Philippines dropped from 5,192 in July 2021 to 3,762 on January 7, 2022.

== Occurrences ==
=== Women in custody ===
Women in the custody of law enforcement officials in the Philippines are vulnerable to torture, including rape and sexual abuse. Between 1995 and 2000 Amnesty International received reports of more than 30 incidents of rape or other sexual abuse of women or girls in custody. The organization fears that this figure represents only a fraction of the real number of cases. Rape of women detainees by police officers, jail guards or military officials always constitutes torture. It is both a physical violation and injury as well as a humiliating assault on a woman's mental and emotional integrity. Other forms of sexual abuse by law enforcement officials, including the threat of rape, verbal sexual abuse, and mocking, designed to degrade and humiliate, may also constitute torture or other forms of cruel, inhuman and degrading treatment. According to Amnesty International's information, there has been only a small number of convictions of police officers for the rape of female detainees.

=== In prostitution ===
Prostitution in the cities of Olongapo and Angeles was highly prominent during the time of the U.S. military bases called Subic Bay Naval Base and Clark Air Base, respectively.

Although the sex trade in the Philippines mostly caters to the indigenous population, NGOs and religious groups regularly sensationalize the problems of prostitution by drawing attention to the foreigner-oriented segment of this business. In Angeles, the control is split between Filipino, Korean, Australian and American bar operators, though in 1987, Australians had a financial interest in more than 60% of the 500 bars and 7,000 prostitutes in the city

Philippines Senator Ramon Bong Revilla, Jr., on July 26, 2006, called for coordination with the Philippine National Police vis-a-vis the public, the whistle blower and anti-prostitution Internet online petitioner initiator, to shed light and solve the alleged human trafficking in the Philippines, prostitution in the Philippines, sexual slavery or trafficking dens in Angeles, Pampanga. Revilla re-filed Senate Bill No. 12, the "Anti Pornography Bill." In 2007, Angeles City police Chief Sonny Cunanan denied the allegations, alleging "the Women's and Children's Concerned Section (WCCS) and other agencies of the Angeles City Government that is responsible for the regular inspection of different bars and nightclubs have no records about the existence of a sex slave camp in the city." But he confirmed that "Angeles intelligence policemen, in coordination with other counterparts, were directed to look into the veracity of the report and file necessary charges against the operators of the illegal activities if these really exist."

=== Rape of children ===
The age of consent in the Philippines was raised from 12 years to 16 years by a law signed by President Rodrigo Duterte in March 2022. This made non-forcible sexual intercourse with a child 15 years and below as statutory rape.

=== Rape of students ===
The 2015 National Baseline Study on Violence Against Children (NBS-VAC), reported 17.1 percent of children aged 13 to 18 had experienced sexual violence, with 5.3 percent having happened “in the school.” The study reported that 3.2 percent of children and youth had experienced forced consummated sex (anal, oral, and/or vaginal) while growing up.

=== Sex trafficking ===
Sex trafficking in the Philippines is a significant problem. Filipina women and girls have been forced into prostitution, raped, and been physically and psychologically abused in a number of ways.

=== Marital rape ===
The Bureau of Democracy, Human Rights, and Labor of the United States Department of State in a 2006 report described the status of marital rape in the Philippines as illegal but added that enforcement is ineffective.

Rape between two persons who are married is acknowledged by law. The Supreme Court of the Philippines first ruled on a marital rape case in 2014 when it upheld the conviction of a man who had raped his wife in 1998. The high court's ruling stated that sexual intercourse between spouses is rape if there is a lack of consent and that "A marriage license should not be viewed as a license for a husband to forcibly rape his wife with impunity".

== Victim silence ==
Most female victims of gang rape remain silent for months before reporting the crime. Obet Montes, coordinator for services of the women's group GABRIELA, says this is due to the victim's fear of society's judgment, of not wanting to be branded as a maruming babae (lit. 'dirty woman'). They further state that oftentimes a rape victim becomes so afraid that she is going to be blamed for the crime that she denies that she was violated.

Claire Padilla, a lawyer and advocate of women's rights who prosecuted the case of a 19-year-old who had the mental capacity of a six-year-old, says that a rape victim who keeps silent becomes easy prey for continued abuse.

== Prevention ==
=== Government ===
The Philippine National Police (PNP) and Department of Social Welfare and Development (DSWD) both maintain help desks to assist victims of violence against women and to encourage the reporting of crimes. With the assistance of NGOs, officers received gender sensitivity training to deal with victims of sexual crimes and domestic violence. Approximately seven to eight percent of PNP officers were women. The PNP has a Women and Children's Unit to deal with these issues.

=== Non-governmental organizations ===
The women's group GABRIELA provides counseling for battered women, rape victims and other victims of violence against women. The Bathaluman Crisis Centre Foundation helps victims of rape and incest. The Support Group Volunteers provide assistance, and psychological interventions may also be initiated at the centre. Where appropriate, cases are referred to other agencies for more specialist assistance. The Women's Crisis Centre (WCC) provides temporary shelter, medical assistance and advocacy, legal assistance and advocacy, and stress management, it has two particularly innovative components – Feminist Counselling, and a Survivors Support Group to rape victims.

== See also ==
- Subic rape case
- Maggie de la Riva rape case
- Violence against women in the Philippines
