= Philippine Commission on Women =

Statutory body for women's rights, Philippine

- Komisyon sa Kababaihan ng Pilipinas

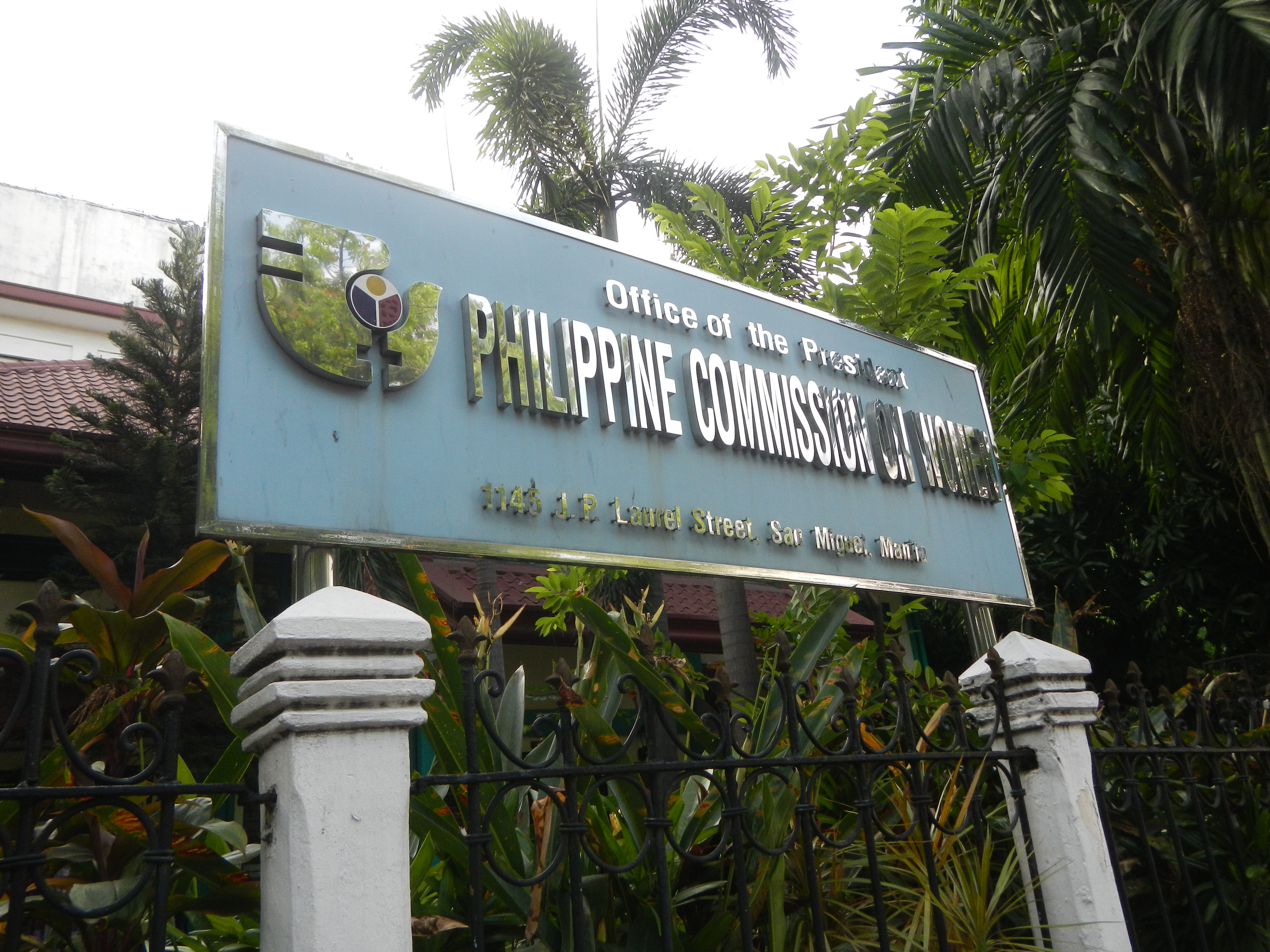

Agency overview
- Formed: January 7, 1975; 51 years ago (formation); September 15, 2009; 17 years ago (present name)
- Jurisdiction: Government of the Philippines
- Headquarters: 1145 J.P. Laurel St., San Miguel, Manila, Philippines
- Employees: 74 (2024)
- Annual budget: ₱140.32 million (2023)
- Parent agency: Department of the Interior and Local Government
- Website: www.pcw.gov.ph

The Philippine Commission on Women (PCW; Filipino: Komisyon sa Kababaihan ng Pilipinas), formerly the National Commission on the Role of the Filipino Women, is a Philippine government agency that is responsible for promoting and protecting the rights of the women in the Philippines. It was established on January 7, 1975, through Presidential Decree No. 633.

On August 14, 2009, the Magna Carta of Women was signed into law providing better protection for women. According to the United Nations' 2009 Human Development Report, the Philippines is 40th out of 155 nations when the gender-related development index is compared directly to the human development index, While the World Economic Forum's Global Gender Gap Report for 2009 lists the country at a ranking 9 among of about 130 countries.

On July 4, 2016, PCW was among the 12 agencies, formerly from the Office of the President reassigned to the Office of the Cabinet Secretary, based on Executive Order No. 1 issued by President Rodrigo Duterte. On October 31, 2018, through Executive Order No. 67, the commission, along with the National Commission on Muslim Filipinos and the National Youth Commission, was transferred from the Office of the Cabinet Secretary to the Department of the Interior and Local Government.

== Organization ==
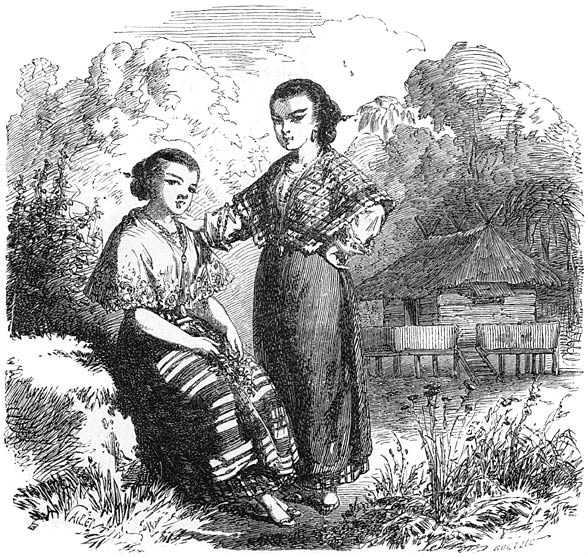
Young Filipinas of Marigondon, early 1800s. From Aventures d'un Gentilhomme Breton aux iles Philippines by Paul de la Gironière (1855). Filipino women often had better rights than their counterparts elsewhere even during colonial times.

The Commission initially established as an advisory body to the President and the Cabinet on policies and programs for the advancement of women. It is mandated "to review, evaluate, and recommend measures, including priorities to ensure the full integration of women for economic, social and cultural development at national, regional and international levels, and to ensure further equality between women and men.

The aims of the organization included the following:

- Conducting policy studies and lobbying for the issuance of executive and legislative measures concerning women.
- Establishing a clearinghouse and information center on women
- Monitoring the implementation of the UN Convention on the Elimination of All Forms of Discrimination Against Women (CEDAW)
- Organizing women into a nationwide movement called "Balikatan sa Kaunlaran" (now registered as an independent women's organization).

== History ==
The commission was established by President Ferdinand Marcos on January 7, 1975, with the intention of promoting the rights of women. After the People Power Revolution, which installed Corazon Aquino into power, in 1986, the agency focused on women's concerns on policymaking in the government. This included the integration of the principle of gender equality in the 1987 Philippine Constitution.

During this period Philippine Development Plan for Women (PDPW) (1989–1992) was adopted through Executive Order No. 348. Shortly after, the "Women in Nation-Building Act" (RA 7192) was enacted, which promotes "the integration of women as full and equal partners of men in development and nation-building". A campaign, supported by the Canadian International Development Agency (CIDA), was initiated to help government officials and staff with training in promoting equality under a program called Gender and Development (GAD).

The Commission continued to push for stronger policies and programs on gender equality, with projects such as the Philippine Plan for Gender-Responsive Development (PPGD) (from 1995 to 2025), a 30-year perspective plan that outlines the policies that enable women to participate and benefit from national development. It was the country's main vehicle for implementing the 1995 Beijing Declaration and Platform for Action (BPfA) adopted at the 1995 UN Fourth World Conference on Women.

Since 1998, the commission's focus has been on poverty alleviation, along with the advancement and protection of women's human rights, promoting women's economic empowerment, and promoting gender-responsive governance.

=== Magna Carta of Women ===
On August 14, 2009, Philippine President Gloria Macapagal Arroyo signed Republic Act 9710, also known as the Magna Carta of Women. Under the law, the "National Commission on the Role of Filipino Women" would be renamed the "Philippine Commission on Women". It will give way to the creation of the Gender Ombudsman under the Commission on Human Rights that will specifically handle women's rights concerns. The law will also provide penalties for the violation of the provisions of the magna carta.

Features of the law include:

- Review amendment or repeal of laws that are discriminatory to women.
- Ensure women's equitable participation and representation in government, political parties, international bodies, civil service, and the private sector.
- Afford equal opportunities to women in relation to education, employment, livelihood, social protection, and others, and including women in the military.
- Mandate access to information and services pertaining to women's health.

The Magna Carta of Women guarantees the rights of women, including farmers and rural workers, informal sector workers and the urban poor, indigenous women, and those with disabilities, as well as older women and girls. These guarantees rights that include those involving food security, affordable and secure housing, employment, the recognition and preservation of cultural identity, and to women's inclusion in discussions pertaining to development and peace issues.

=== Safe Spaces Act ===
Republic Act No. 11313, known as the Safe Spaces Act or the "Bawal Bastos Law", authored by Senator Risa Hontiveros, was signed into law by President Rodrigo Duterte on April 17, 2019. Its implementing rules and regulations was signed by Hontiveros in October that year. The act aims to reform laws and policies surrounding gender-based street and public spaces harassment, both offline and online.

== Functions ==
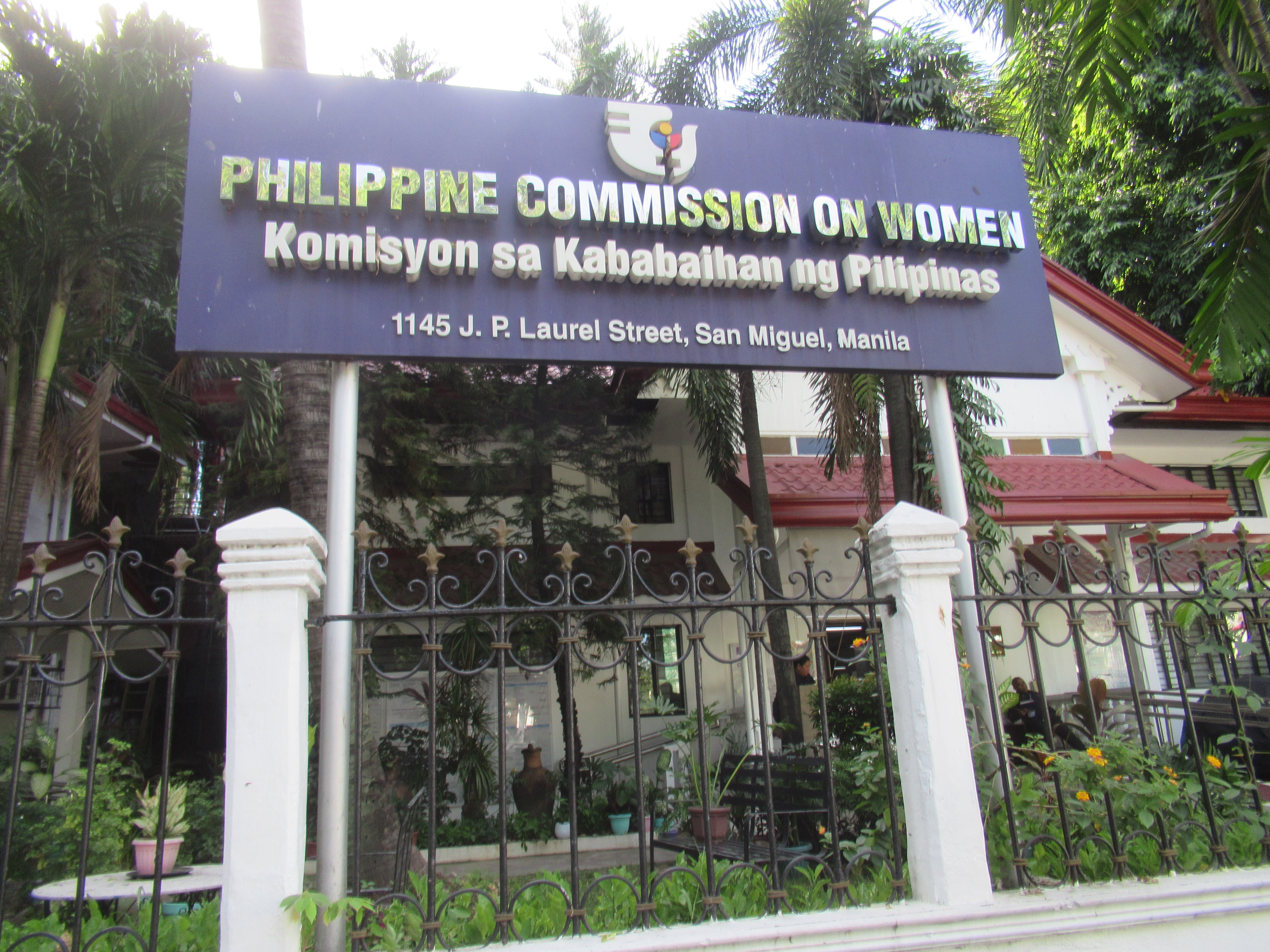
Façade, gate, 2023

The functions of the Commission include the institution of gender responsiveness in national development plans, by preparing, assessing, and updating the National Plan for Women and by ensuring its implementation and monitoring its performance among the government agencies it is involved with. It also undertakes the advocacy of promoting economic, social and political empowerment of women by providing technical assistance in the strengthening of mechanisms on gender mainstreaming. Aside from this, the Commission ensures contributions by Filipino women to Philippine culture and traditions be preserved and enhanced in the process of modernization.

The commission also coordinates with the provisions of the NCRFW by preparing plans for the development of the lives women, with continuous monitoring and assessment with the cooperation of relevant agencies. It also provides a database for information relating to women. Other activities include: gender-consciousness awareness programs, policy studies, legislation reviews that integrate women's concerns, technical services that ensure the development of institutional capabilities for gender and development (GAD) mainstreaming in government agencies and selected partners, monitoring and assessment of the implementation of laws and policies on women including the implementation of international conventions such as the Beijing Platform for Action, and the implementation of pilot projects for the delivery of services for women as basis for policy formulation and program recommendations.

== See also ==
- Gender inequality in the Philippines
