= Intimate partner sexual violence =

Sexual violence within the context of domestic violence

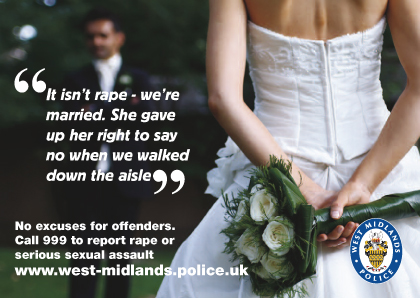
West Midlands Police - Rape and Serious Sexual Offences Campaign

Intimate partner sexual violence (IPSV) deals with sexual violence within the context of domestic violence. Intimate partner sexual violence is defined by any unwanted sexual contact or activity by an intimate partner in order to control an individual through fear, threats, or violence. Women are the primary victims of this type of violence.

== Domestic violence and sexual abuse ==
Domestic sexual violence, such as forced sex or marital rape, may follow or be part of physical abuse, but is not always the case. In Mexico and the United States, studies estimate that 40–52% of women experiencing physical violence by an intimate partner have also been sexually coerced by that partner.

Sexual violence may occur without physical violence. In the Indian state of Uttar Pradesh, in a representative sample of over 6000 men, 7% reported having sexually and physically abused their wives, 22% reported using sexual violence without physical violence and 17% reported that they had used physical violence alone.

Around 30% of women are victims of physical and/or sexual violence by an intimate partner.

== Types of coercion ==
Aggressors can use different techniques to sexually abuse their partner.

=== Emotional coercion ===
Emotional coercion can be seen through the use of threats, manipulation, harassment, and neglect. A study shows that the harm done through this type of coercion is comparable to that done by rape.

=== Threats to a third party ===
Threats to a third party involve threatening the victim to do what the abuser wants or else they will inflict pain on people the victim cherishes.

=== Threats of harm to the victim ===
Threats of harm to the victim imply threatening to inflict pain on the victim, whether by the intimate partner or by outsiders.

=== Physical force ===
Physical force is the use of objects, substances, and/or one's own body to obtain sex. Homicide committed by an intimate partner is often preceded by sexual acts obtained through physical force.

=== Online sexual violence ===
A recent CNN investigation revealed a global online network encouraging, teaching and normalizing sexual violence mainly among partners. The victims are unconscious and the videos are uploaded online for others to see.

== Health effects ==
Intimate partner sexual violence is linked to sexual, physical, psychological, and reproductive damage. The effects can vary in duration.

Women who are victims of intimate partner sexual violence are at high risk of getting HIV and STIs. One reason for this is that men who are violent in this manner usually have dangerous habits like engaging in sexual acts with many individuals.

Victims of intimate partner sexual violence are also at risk of having undesirable pregnancies, abortions, miscarriages, and stillbirths. Infertility is another possible consequence of this violence on women.

Young victims of intimate partner sexual violence can come to adopt unhealthy behaviors such as the use of alcohol and drugs.

Children who have seen intimate partner sexual violence are profoundly affected psychologically. They can experience post-traumatic stress disorder, depression, and anxiety. Children are likely to incorporate what they see into their belief systems because they are accustomed to it.

== Incidence by country ==
Studies indicate that sexual assault by an intimate partner is neither rare nor unique to any particular region of the world. For instance, 23% of women in North London, England, reported having been the victim of either an attempted or completed rape by a partner in their lifetime. Similar figures have been reported for Guadalajara, Mexico (23.0%), León, Nicaragua, (21.7%), Lima, Peru (22.5%), and for the Midlands Province in Zimbabwe (25.0%). The prevalence of women sexually assaulted by an intimate partner in their lifetime (including attempted assaults) has also been estimated in a few national surveys (for example, Canada 8.0%, England, Wales and Scotland (combined) 14.2%, Finland 5.9%, Switzerland 11.6% and the United States 7.7%, Nigeria 22.3). in France According to estimates, 220,000 women are victims of violence, 94,000 are raped each year and at least 100 were killed by their partners in 2021. Around 30% of sexual violence offenders were found to have committed violence before, 29% of complaints cases failed to move from police to the judiciary and 80% are closed without getting justice.

The table below summarizes some available data on the prevalence of sexual coercion by intimate partners.

Percentage of adult women reporting sexual assaults by an intimate partner selected population-based surveys 1989 - 2000
Country	Study population	Year	Sample size	Assaulted in the past 12 months attempted or completed sex	Ever assaulted attempted or completed forced sex	Ever assaulted completed forced sex
Brazil	São Paulo	2000	941	2.8%	10.1%
Brazil	Pernambuco	2000	1188	5.6%	14.3%
Canada	national	1993	12300		8.0%
Canada	Toronto	1991 to 1992	420		15.3%
Chile	Santiago	1997	310	9.1%
Finland	national	1997 to 1998	7051	2.5%	5.9%
Japan	Yokohama	2000	1287	1.3%	6.2%
Indonesia	Central Java	1999 to 2000	765	13.0%		22.0%
Mexico	Durango	1996	384		42.0%
Mexico	Guadalajara	1996	650	15.0%	23.0%
Nicaragua	León	1993	360		21.7%
Nicaragua	Managua	1997	378	17.7%
Peru	Lima	2000	1086	7.1%	22.5%
Peru	Cusco	2000	1534	22.9%	46.7%
Puerto Rico	national	1993 to 1996	7079			5.7%
Sweden	Umeå	1991	251			7.5%
Switzerland	national	1994 to 1995	1500		11.6%
Thailand	Bangkok	2000	1 051	17.1%	29.9%
Thailand	Nakhon Sawan	2000	1027	15.6%	28.9%
Turkey	East and south-east Anatolia	1998	599			51.9%
United Kingdom	England, Scotland and Wales	1989	1007			14.2%
United Kingdom	North London	1993	430	6.0%	23.0%
United States	national	1995 to 1996	8000	0.2%	7.7%
West Bank and Gaza Strip	Palestinians	1995	2410	27.0%
Zimbabwe	Midlands Province	1996	966		25.0%

== See also ==
- Domestic violence
- Intimate partner violence
- Marital rape
- Sexual assault
- Thordis Elva - Rape victim who collaborated with her assailant to author a book about the experience
