= Reed mat =

Type of mat

Reed mats are handmade mats of plaited reed or other plant materials.

== East Asia ==
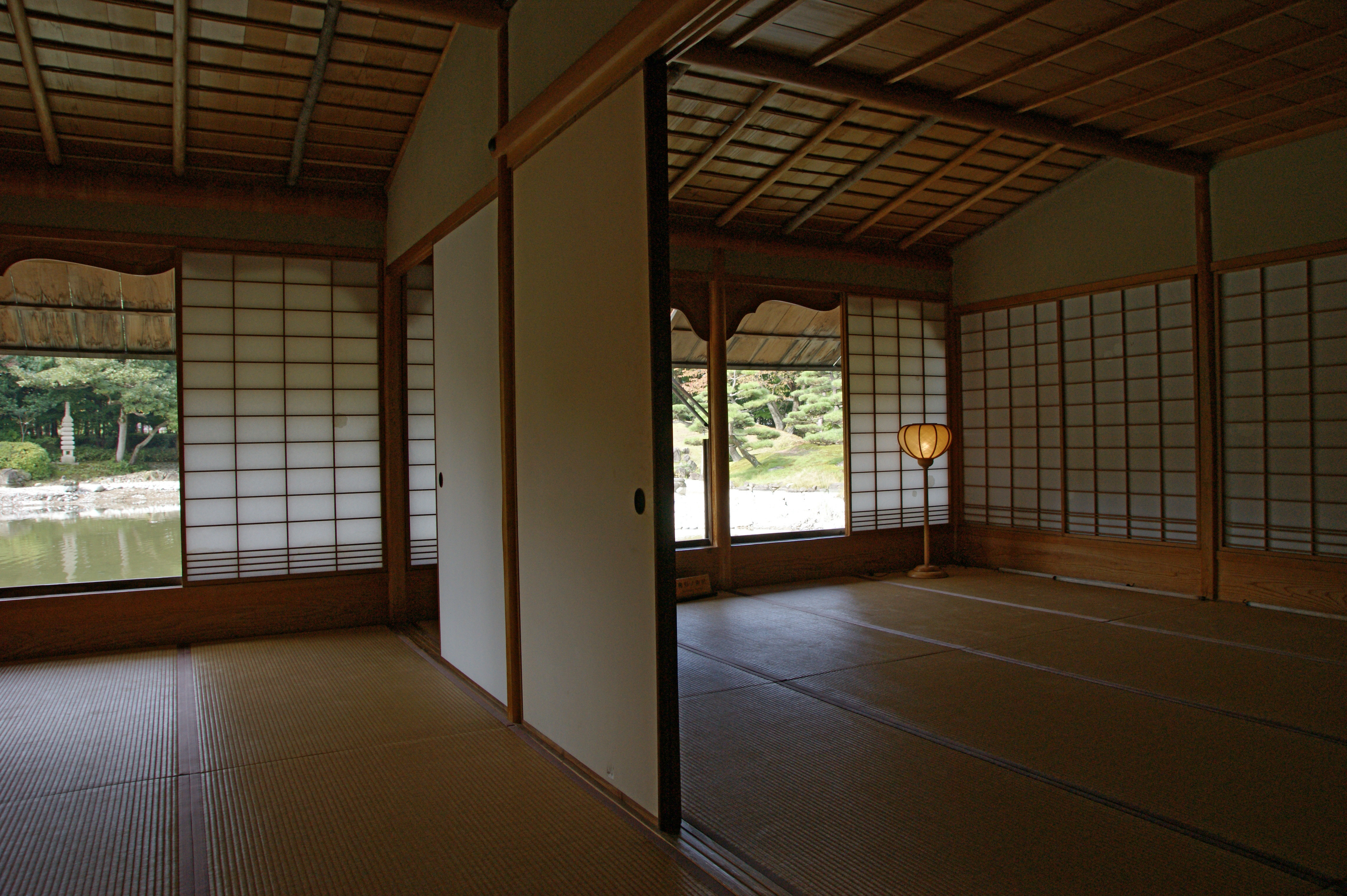
Room with tatami flooring in an “inauspicious layout” and paper doors (shōji)

In Japan, a traditional reed mat is the tatami (畳). Tatami are covered with a weft-faced weave of soft rush (藺草, igusa) (common rush), on a warp of hemp or weaker cotton. There are four warps per weft shed, two at each end (or sometimes two per shed, one at each end, to cut costs). The doko (core) is traditionally made from sewn-together rice straw, but contemporary tatami sometimes have compressed wood chip boards or extruded polystyrene foam in their cores, instead or as well. The long sides are usually edged (縁, heri) with brocade or plain cloth, although some tatami have no edging.

== Southeast Asia ==
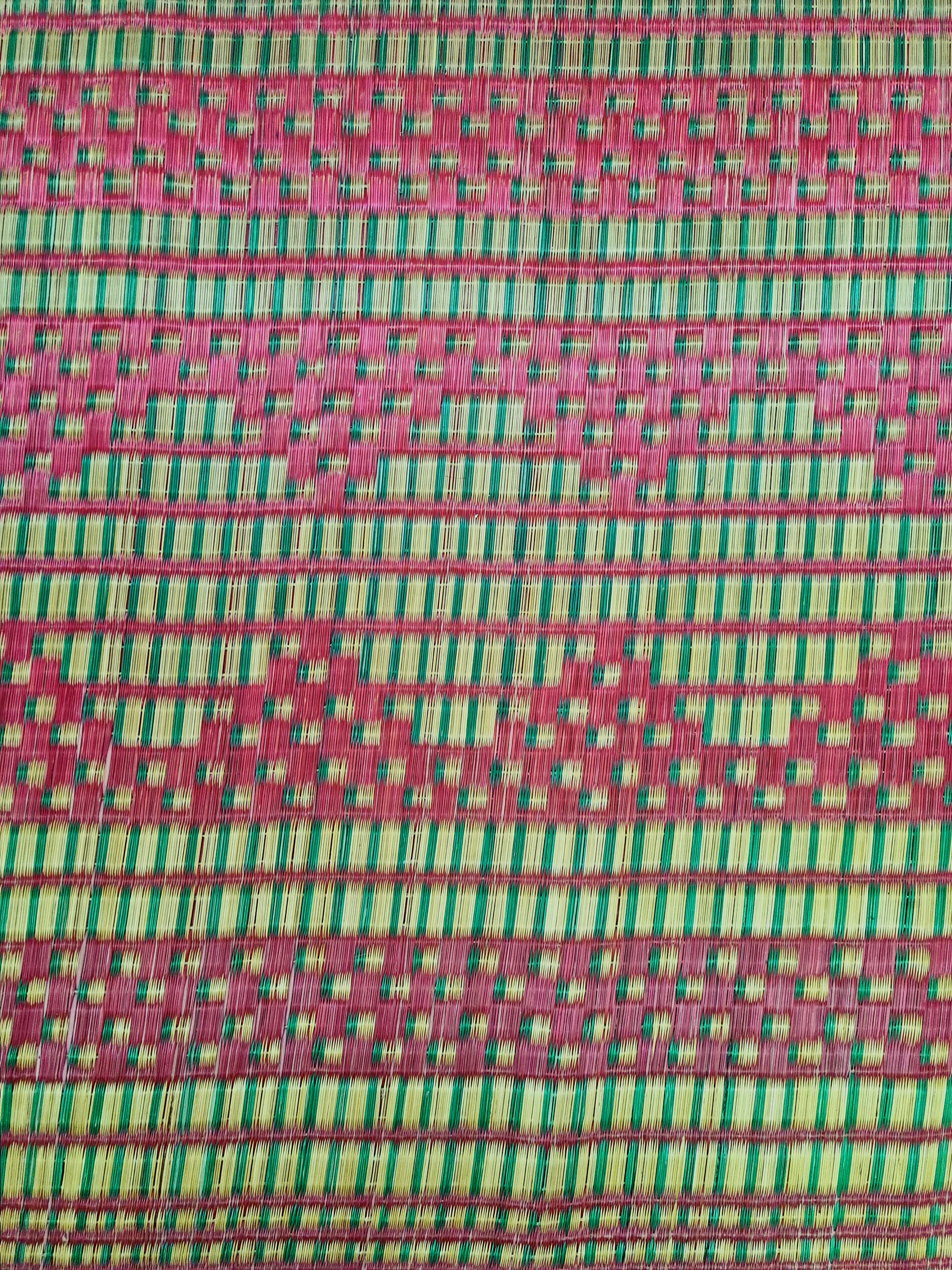
Cambodian reed mat known as kontael krahom.

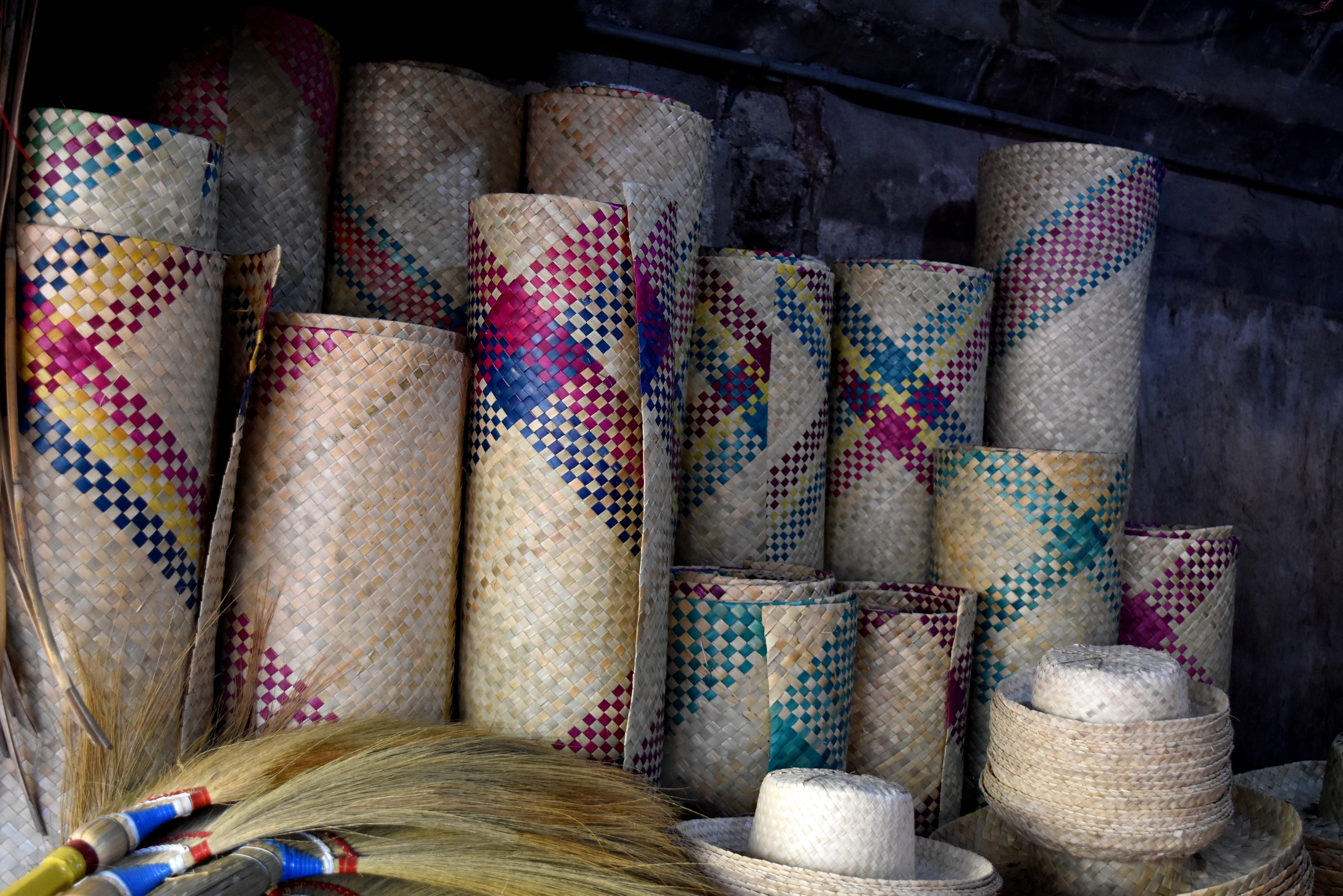
Banig in the Philippines sold with various other traditional handicrafts

In the Philippines, woven reed mats are called banig. They are used as sleeping mats or floor mats, and were also historically used as sails. They come in many different weaving styles and typically have colorful geometric patterns unique to the ethnic group that created them. They are made from buri palm leaves, pandan leaves, rattan, or various kinds of native reeds known by local names like tikog, sesed (Fimbristykis miliacea), rono, or bamban.

In Thailand and Cambodia, the mats are produced by plaiting reeds, strips of palm leaf, or some other easily available local plant. The supple mats made by this process of weaving without a loom are widely used in Thai homes. These mats are also now being made into shopping bags, place mats, and decorative wall hangings.

One popular kind of Thai mat is made from a kind of reed known as Kachud, which grows in the southern marshes. After the reeds are harvested, they are steeped in mud, which toughens them and prevents them from becoming brittle. They are then dried in the sun for a time and pounded flat, after which they are ready to be dyed and woven into mats of various sizes and patterns.

Other mats are produced in different parts of Thailand, most notably in the eastern province of Chanthaburi. Durable as well as attractive, they are plaited entirely by hand with an intricacy that makes the best resemble finely woven fabrics.

== South Asia ==
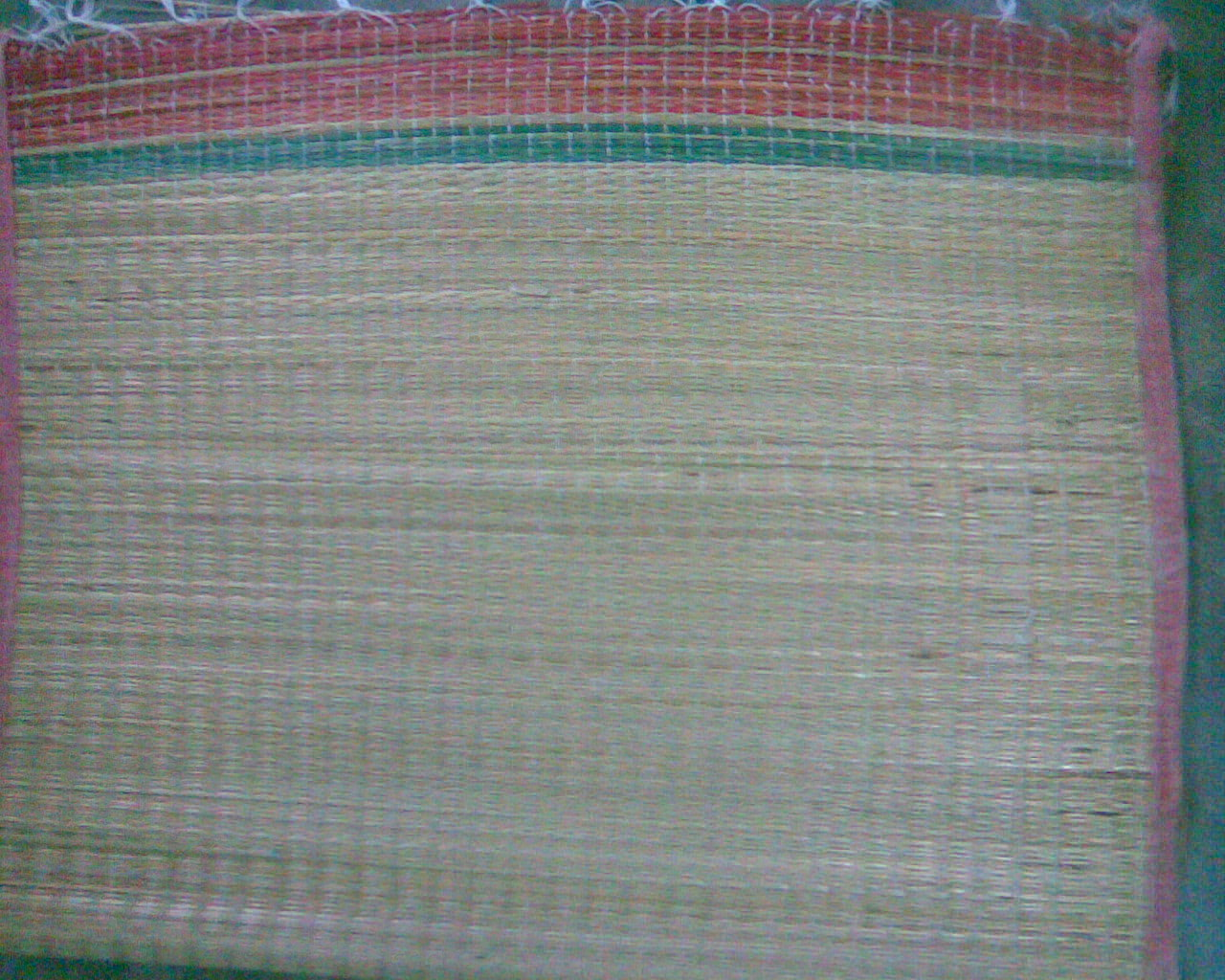
Reed mat from India

In India, reed mats (called paay in Tamil or chatai in Hindi) are used as cooling and eco-friendly floor coverings.

== See also ==
- Cambodian mat
- Banig
- Tatami
- Screw pine craft of Kerala
