= Cambodian mat =

Floorcovering

- Type: Mat
- Inception: Angkorian period
- Manufacturer: Weavers of the Mekong

A Cambodian mat also known as a kantael (Khmer: កន្ទេល) is a woven mat made from palm or reed in Cambodia. The Cambodian mat consists of an ordinary mat, below which are fixed pads of strongly packed cotton, with the help of a special loom. They are specific to the Khmer people.

== History ==
Mats have been woven in Cambodia since Angkorian times, as evidenced by carvings on the bas-relief of Angkor Wat.

When the French missionary Charles-Émile Bouillevaux, after being the first Frenchmen to discover Angkor Wat, traveled to the Eastern bank of the Mekong and encountered the Bunong people, he considered it an honour to be invited to sit on a Cambodian mat.

During his exploration trip in the 1880s, the French anthropologist Edouard Maurel acknowledged that there was something unique to the Cambodian mat, which he took as evidence of the luxury of the once flourishing Khmer civilization:

The necessity of making frequent removals has also inspired the Cambodian mattress. The mat is not thick and furnishes a comfortable relief, but the Cambodian sybarites have sought for something better, and found it.

— Edouard Morel

Auguste Pavie during his exploration of Cambodia, noticed that the King of Cambodia himself could sit on this type of Cambodian mat.

At the end of the 19th century, the Cambodian mat was seen as the model for all the straw mats across Asia. Thus, French explorers in Vietnam refer to these straw mats as "Cambodian mats" while explorers in Yunnan described the beads of Chinese peasants as made of three planks on wooden trestles covered with rice straw and a Cambodian mat on top.

The French protectorate of Cambodia promoted the export of Cambodian mats. The Cambodian mat was promoted as "a fine and neat article" which attracted the attention of Japanese merchants at the Hanoi Exhibition in 1903; it was often sold in Saigon stuffed with kapok. Rather than Picot camp beds which were heavy and difficult to carry around in Indochina, the French colonialists recommended the use of Cambodian mats when travelling in French Indochina.

Unfortunately, woven plant mats have been largely supplanted by colored plastics mats imported from Thailand and Vietnam since 1981.

Since the beginning of the 21st century, weavers have learned how to dye and design patterns such as lanterns, pineapple eyes, grids, and strings.

In 2017, the French Cultural Center in Cambodia organized an itinerant exhibition called Mats and Table towels (Nattes et Nappes) which saw table cloths and sitting mats as two distinctive elements of France and Cambodia respectively.

The Cambodia Sedge Mats Business Association (CSMA) was set up to work as a trade organisation and promote Cambodian mats on the national and international markets. As of 2022, the Cambodian mats remain widely popular within the country and natural mats are preferred to nylon mats.

== Production ==
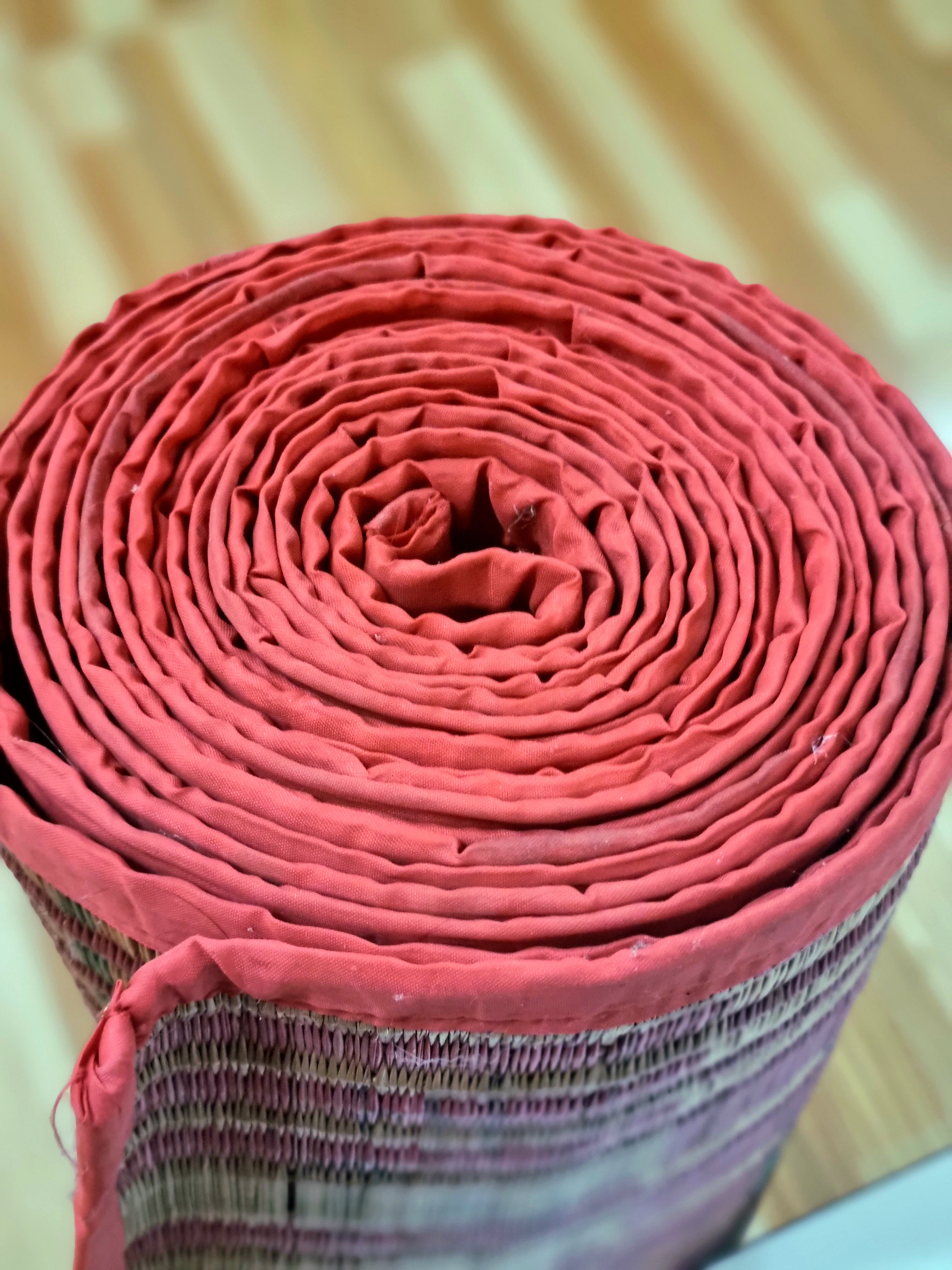
The Cambodian red mat, with its red cotton trimming, is easy to roll away and keep stored during the day.

The region of Cambodia best-known for mat weaving is the Mekong floodplain, especially around Lvea Aem district. Mats are usually a cottage industry woven by craftswomen sitting on mats in their private homes. The most popular mats in Cambodia are made of mangrove fan palm. While they are more rare, Cambodian mats can also be made of wicker and rattan (tbanh kanchoeur) made from dryandra trees. Reeds are usually grown on the edge of rice fields for making mats when the water recedes from the lake behind their village during the dry season when weaving is done from January to May.

Cambodian mats can be made from a variety of sedges, rattan and leaves such as grey sedge, rice sedge, red nut sedge, cool mat, Calamus viminalis or Khmer rattan, mangrove fan palm, palm leaves, banana leaves, talipot palm leaves, sago palm leaves and water hyacinth.

=== Mangrove palm tree mats: kantael pa'au ===
The mangrove palm tree first needs to be cut and divided into three sections: one is the central spine, and the two other is the soft wings on both sides. The fiber is then split and flattened. The shell is peeled off, and only the soft thread remains. They are then dried in the sun for a whole day and collected in bundles in the shade. Water is sprayed regularly to prevent the fiber from drying out and twisting. The threads are then sorted apart, with the long threads apart for weaving mats.

=== Red mats: kantael krahom ===
Red mats or kantael krahom are a kind reed mat woven from the bark of the red nut sedge known in Khmer as kravanh chruk. Craftsmen cut the reeds into small pieces of one meter length before dying the fibers of the cuttings by dipping them in red, white, green and yellow according to their preferred color. Cambodian red mats were exported and sold in Vietnam at least since the 19th century. Red mats are usually weaved with white reeds that are not diked at one top side to identify its orientation as it would be inconvenient that the head lay were the feet have trodden. It is a secondary source of income for Cambodian farmers who can add up to 2000 US dollars to the yearly revenue by weaving these red mats.

=== Water hyacinth mats: kantael komplaok ===
In recent years, Khmer people have also made mats for tableware and sleeping from dried water hyacinth. In fact, the plant, despite its beauty is fast-growing and often clogs waterways on the Tonle Sap. While its soft texture has made it popular, its durability is limited.

== Use ==
Cambodian mats are an important piece of furniture in all Cambodian homes where such furniture is usually limited. Traditionally, palm mats were used both for as a sleeping mattress and a tablecloth on which families sit while they share their meals.

Mats are commonly laid out for guests and are important building materials for homes, and they are often used as wedding gifts.

During religious ceremonies, Cambodian people do not usually sit on chairs or bare floors but rather on mat-covered floors.

While these Cambodian mats were for family use, they have become popular among urban Khmer people and foreign tourists for decoration.

== Literature ==
The French author Claude Farrère refers often to the Cambodian mat in Les Petites Allées, Le Quadrille des Mers de Chine, and La Sonate à la Mer, as an exotic reference to the colonial fantasm, which can also be found in the novel Lélie, fumeuse d'opium published under pseudonym and illustrated with pin-up illustrations of nude and semi-nude women by Raphael Kirchner.
