= Haja Amina Appi =

Filipino master mat weaver and teacher (1925–2013)

- Born: June 25, 1925
- Died: April 2, 2013 (aged 87)
- Known for: Textile
- Style: Sama traditional weaving
- Awards: National Living Treasure Award; 2004

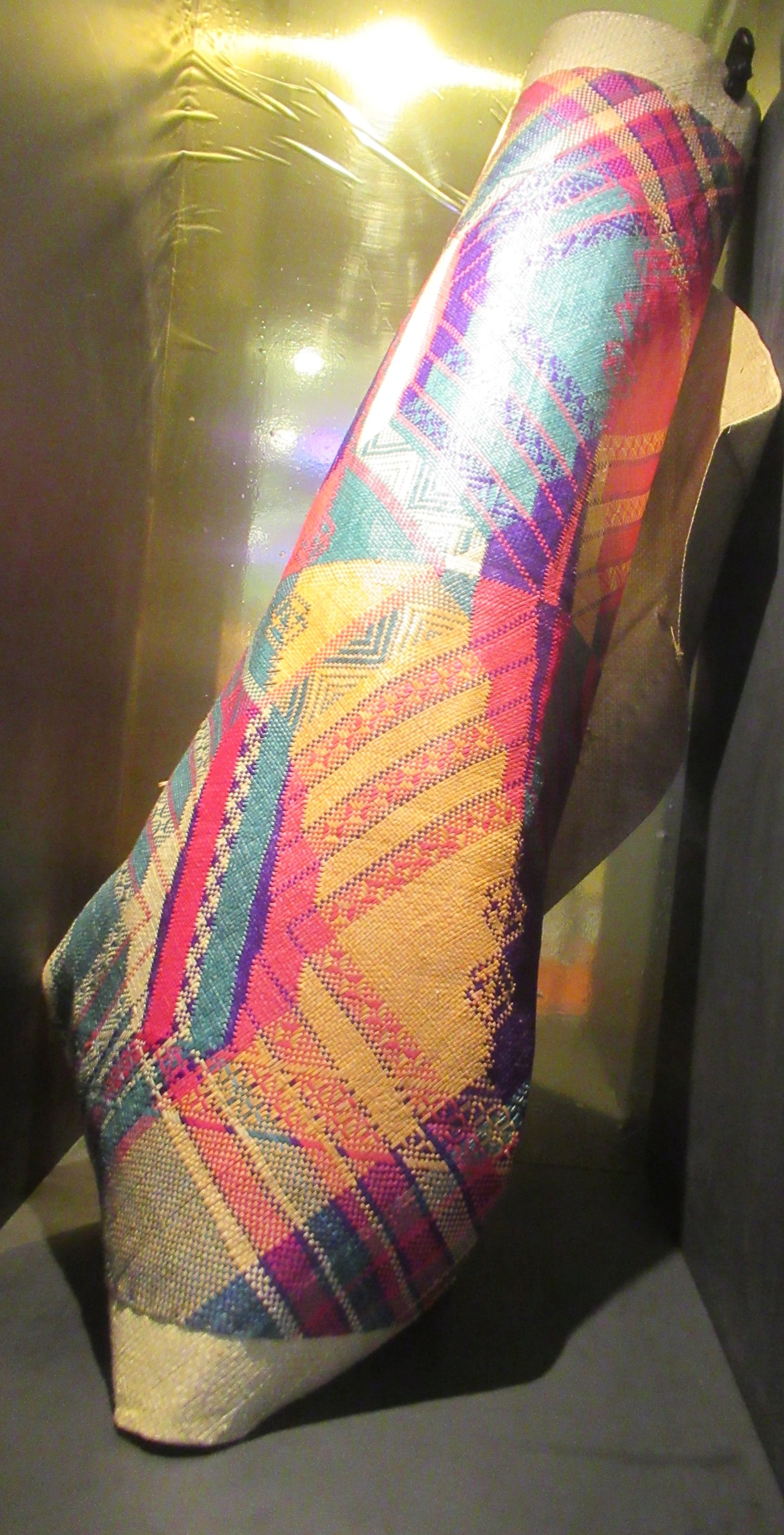
Amina Appi's Tepo (Tandubas Sama mat)

Haja Amina Appi (June 25, 1925 – April 2, 2013) was a Filipino master tepo mat weaver and teacher from the Sama indigenous people of Ungos Matata, Tandubas, Tawi-Tawi. She was credited with creating colorful pandan mats with complex geometric patterns. Her creations were acclaimed for their precise sense of design, proportion and symmetry, and sensitivity to color.

She was given the National Living Treasures Award in 2004 by the Philippines through the National Commission for Culture and the Arts.

== Background ==
Haja Appi was known for creating finely woven mats with highly intricate designs. An older tradition produced Sama mats in plain white. However, Haja Appi experimented with dyes for her designs, mixing her own dyes to create striking designs for her mats.

The entire process of creating mats is handed down exclusively among women among the Sama of Tawi-Tawi. Traditionally it was passed down from mother to daughter. Haja Appi taught many young women in her community the art of mat-making in order to preserve her art for future generations.
