= Amakan =

Philippine woven split-bamboo mats

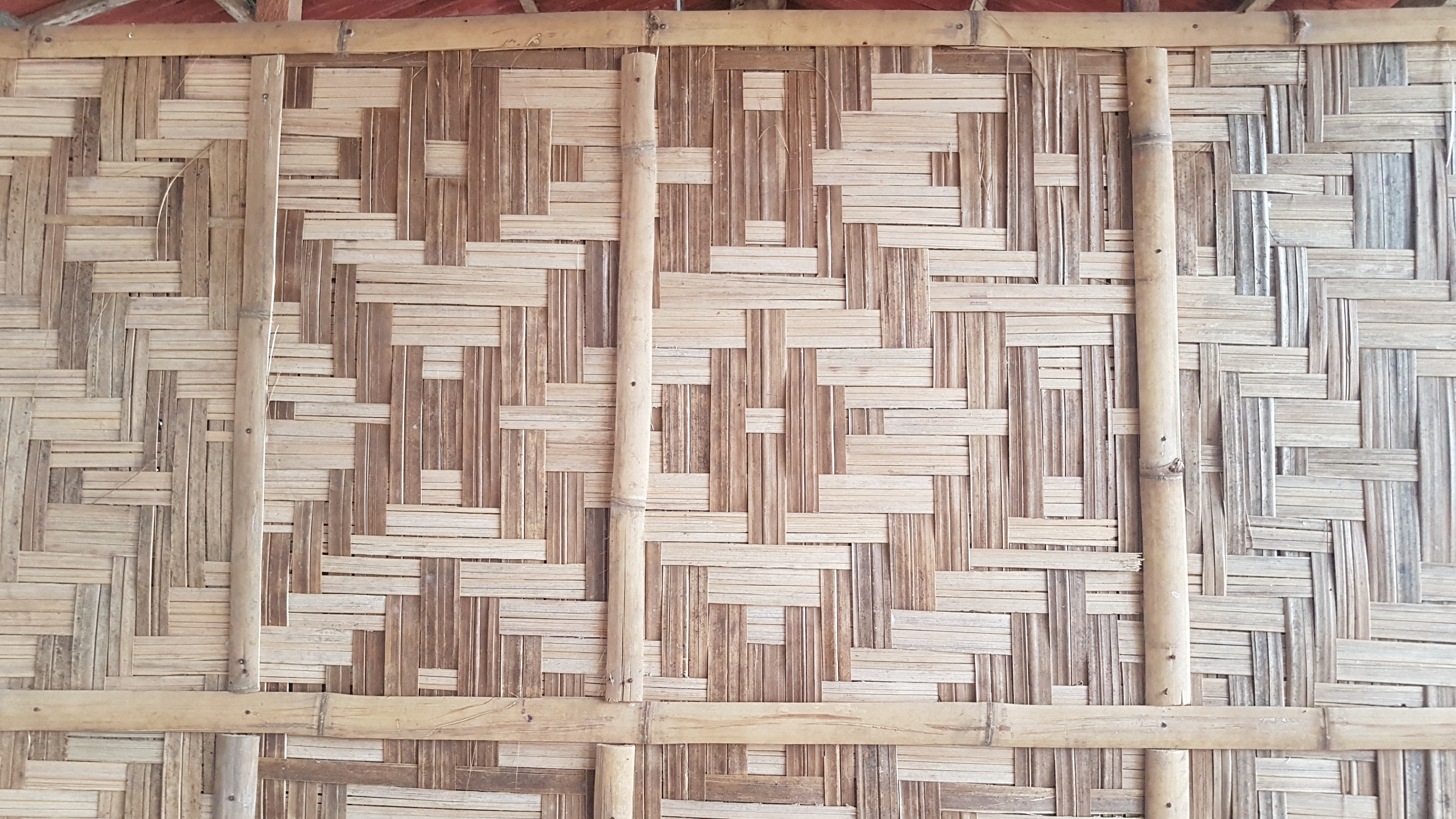
A typical amakan wall in a beach hut in Misamis Oriental

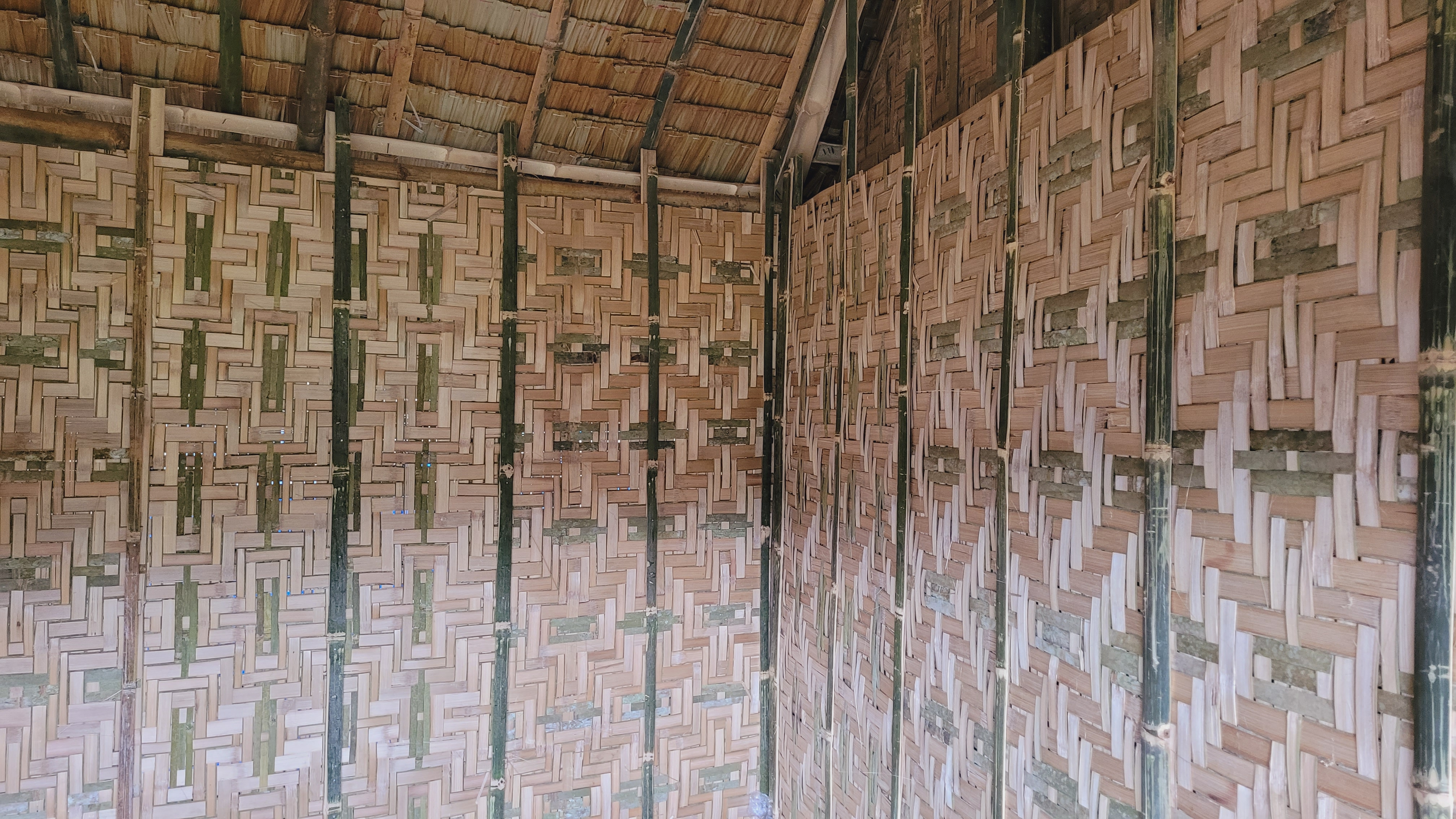
Amakan walls in diamond and cross patterns in Bukidnon

Amakan, also known as sawali in the northern Philippines, is a type of traditional woven split-bamboo mats used as walls, paneling, or wall cladding in the Philippines. They are woven into various intricate traditional patterns, often resulting in repeating diagonal, zigzag, or diamond-like shapes. The term "sawali" is more properly defined as twilled weaving patterns. The term can also be applied to baskets and banig (soft woven mats made from pandan leaves, buri palm straw, abaca, or sedges), which also use the same weaving patterns. Amakan panels are commonly confused with pawid (nipa panels), which are made from thatched leaves.

Amakan are used as walls in the traditional nipa huts (bahay kubo) of the Philippines. They are lightweight and porous, allowing air circulation to keep buildings cool in the hot tropical climate. The porosity also balances pressure inside the house during strong winds, minimizing roof damage. Amakan needs to be treated before installation. They are soaked in seawater, dried, and then usually (but not always) varnished. They are usually affixed to a wooden framework, then battened with bamboo or coco lumber.

Amakan is associated with lower income rural housing because it is inexpensive and easy to replace. It is not uncommon for amakan to also be used as a design element (usually as cladding or paneling) in modern Filipino architecture to portray a rustic, traditional and tropical aesthetic. It also ecologically sustainable because it is made with bamboo.

== Similar traditions ==
=== Pawid ===
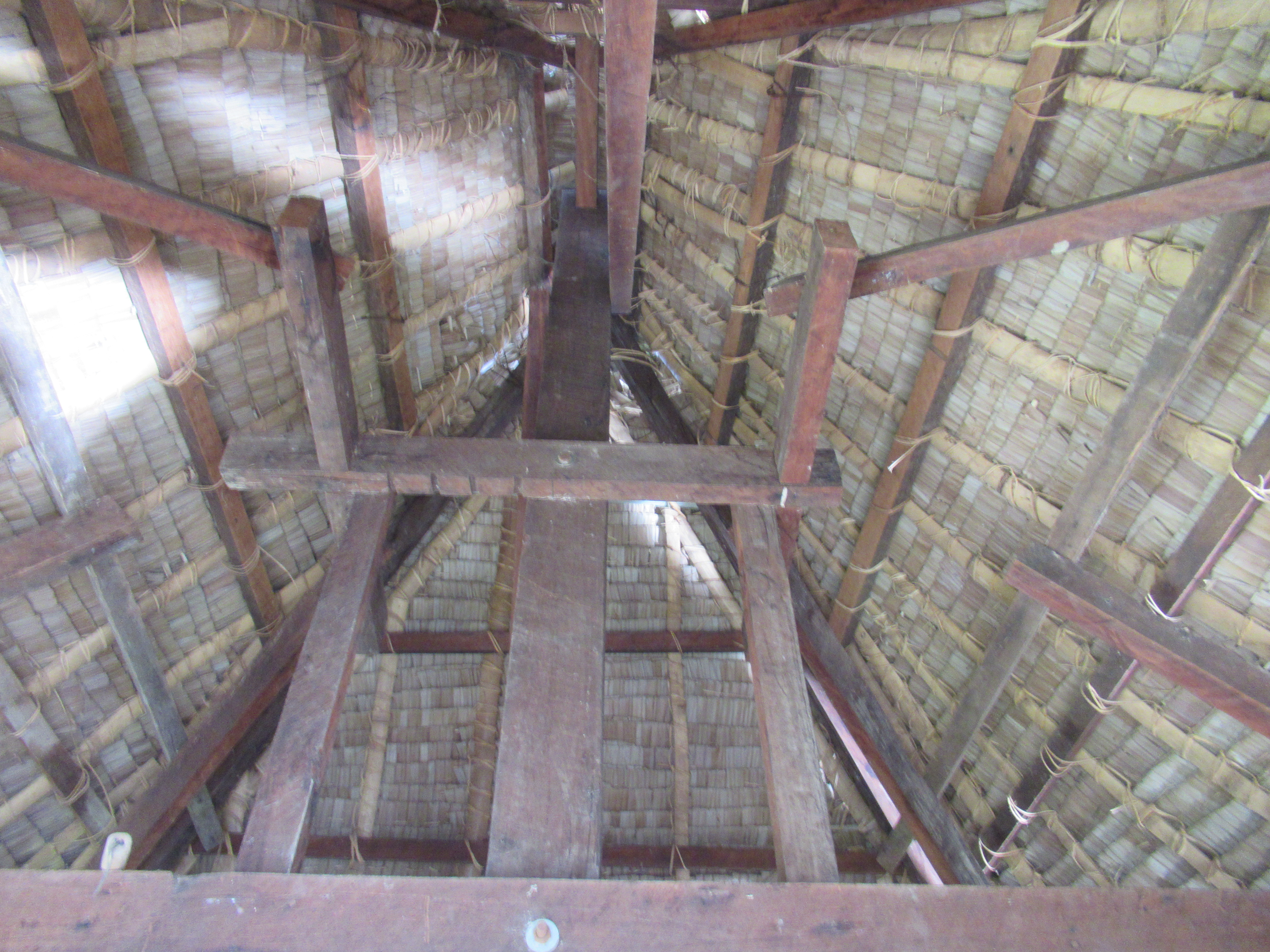
Interior view of a traditional roof made from thatched nipa leaves (pawid) in Pulilan, Bulacan

A simpler method of making panels from leaves is called pawid, which is simply thatching. It predominantly uses nipa palm leaves, and is the origin of the name of the nipa hut. But it can also use other materials like coconut leaves, anahaw leaves, and even cogon grass. They are made by simply folding the leaves once around a split bamboo stick and then sewing them together near the base. They are most commonly used as roofing, with the panels layered over each other so the water runs down the leaves and away from the inner roof. They are constantly replaced as the panels get damaged.

=== Sulirap ===
A similar weaving tradition is called sulirap, surilap, or salirap among Visayans; and sulirap, selirap, or sayrap among the Tausug, Yakan, and Sama-Bajau people. It uses an entire coconut palm leaf split lengthwise along the midrib (rachis). Then both halves are positioned with the leaflets in between them. The leaflets are then intricately woven into various patterns and designs to join the two split parts together. This results in a lengthwise woven panel with the split midrib providing the upper and lower border. It is used similarly as amakan and sawali: as cheap walls, roofs, awnings, or temporary shade. This method, modified slightly, can also be used to make traditional baskets.

== Gallery ==
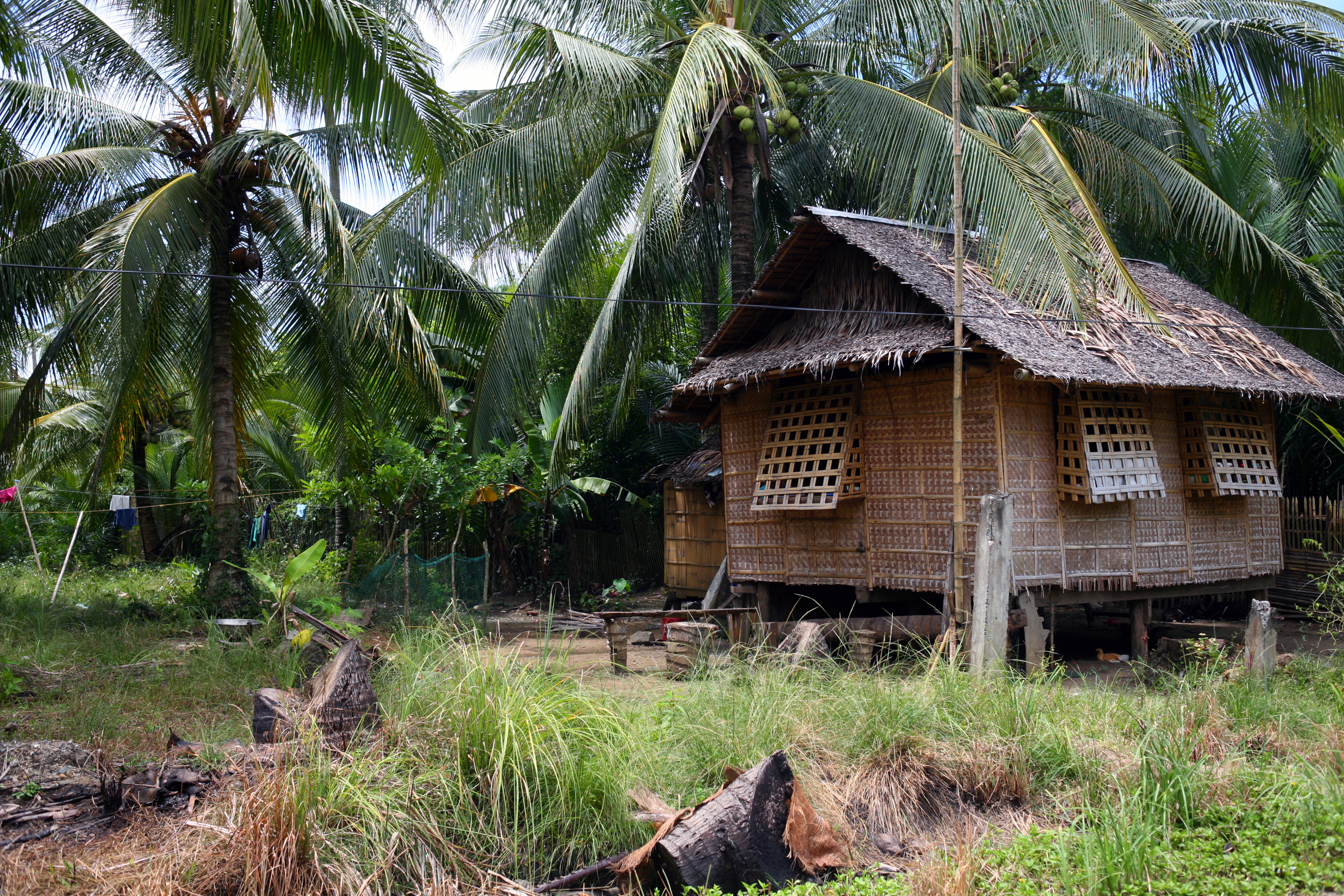
A rural house in Aklan with plain amakan walls

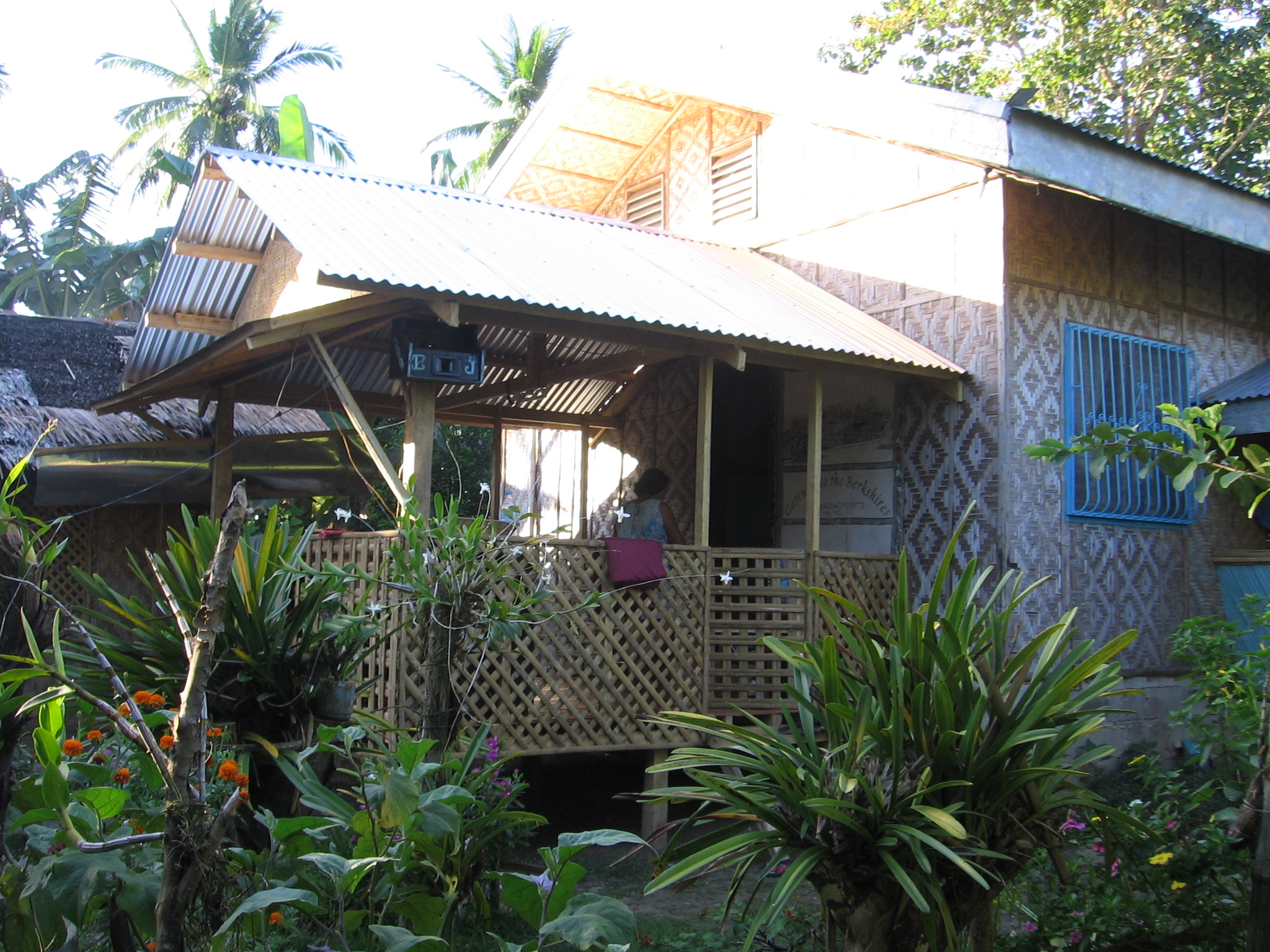
A rural house in Leyte with amakan sidings woven into diamond patterns

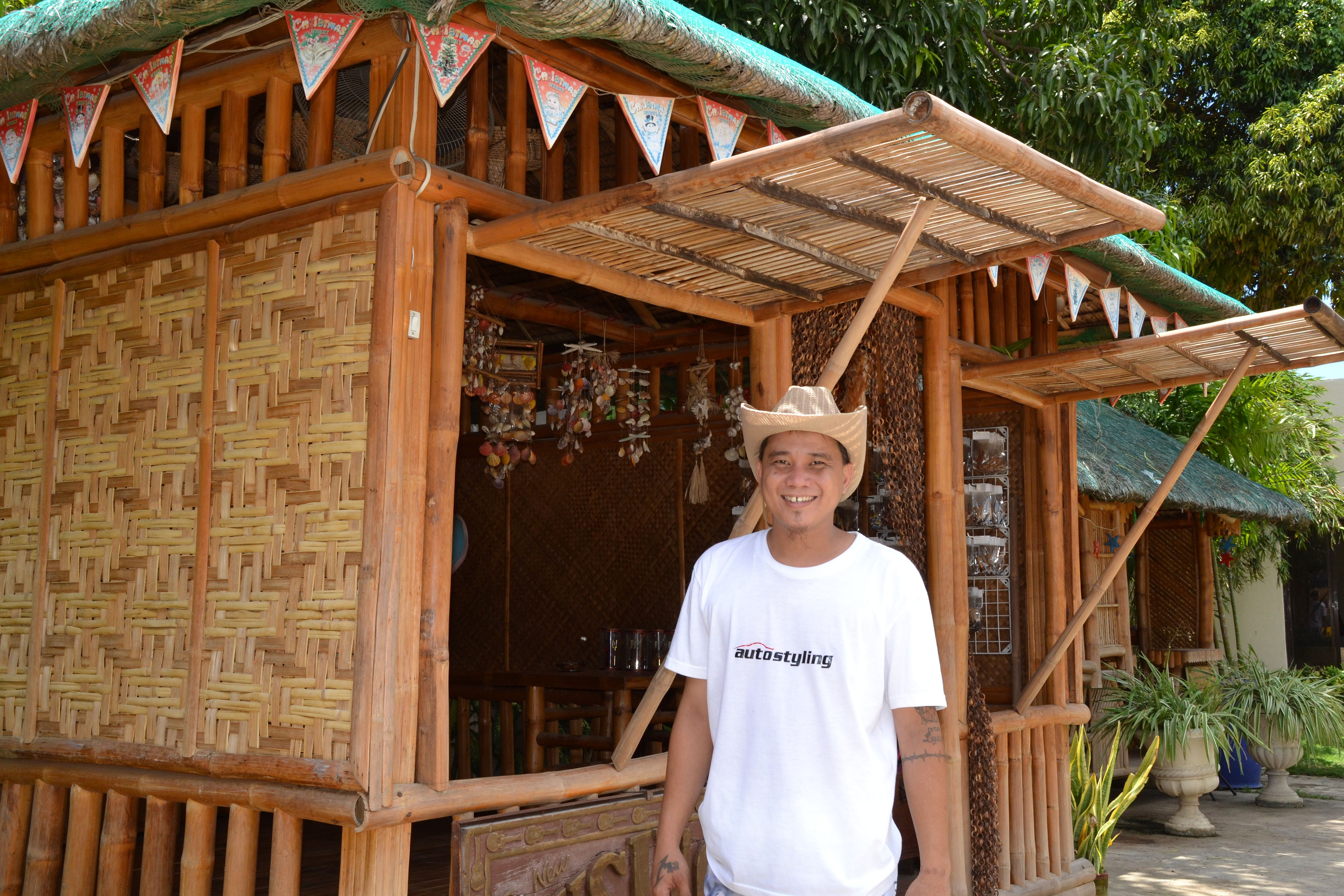
A gift shop in Bohol with amakan walls

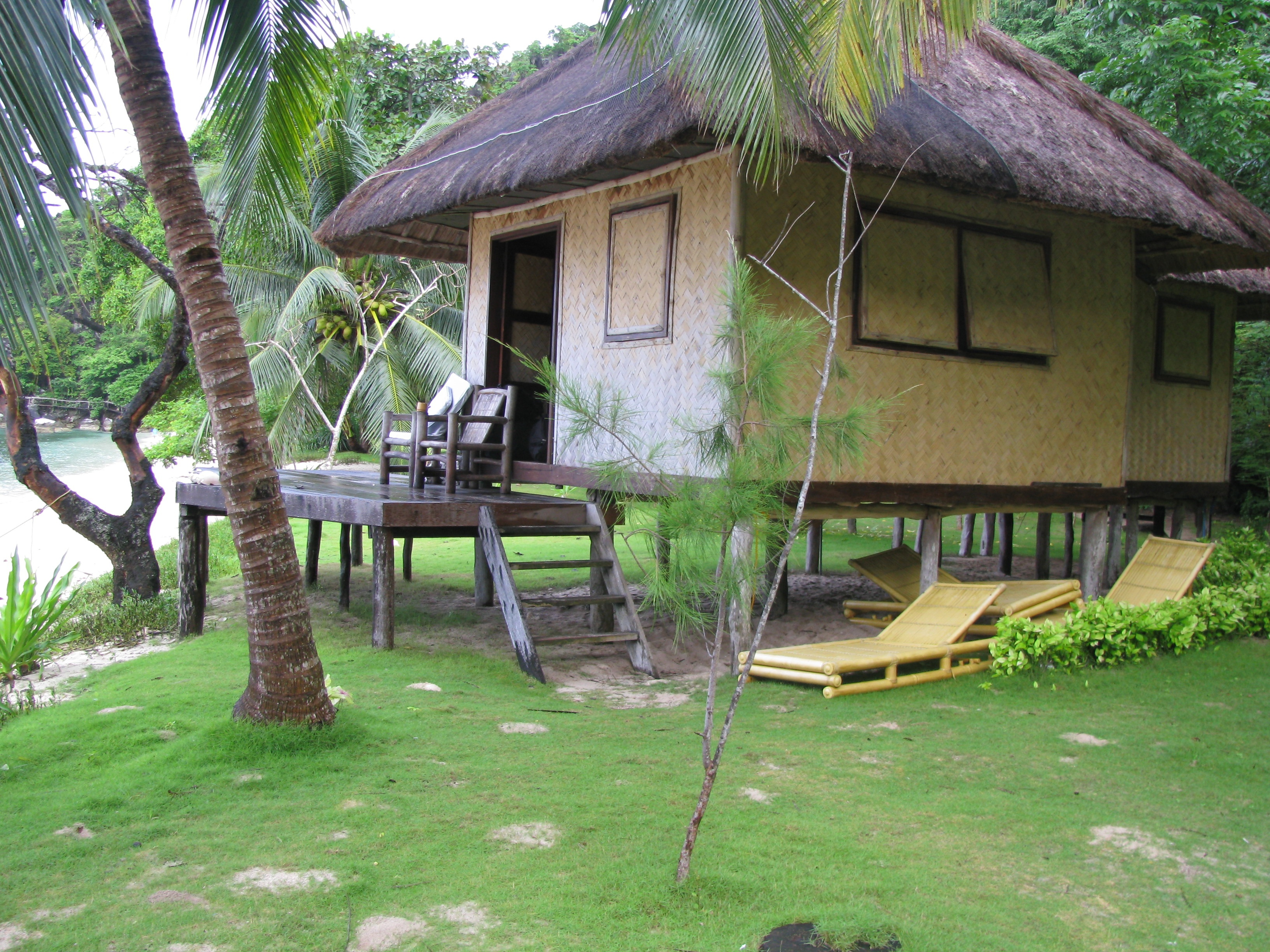
A modern resort guesthouse in Busuanga, Palawan with plain diagonally-woven sawali walls

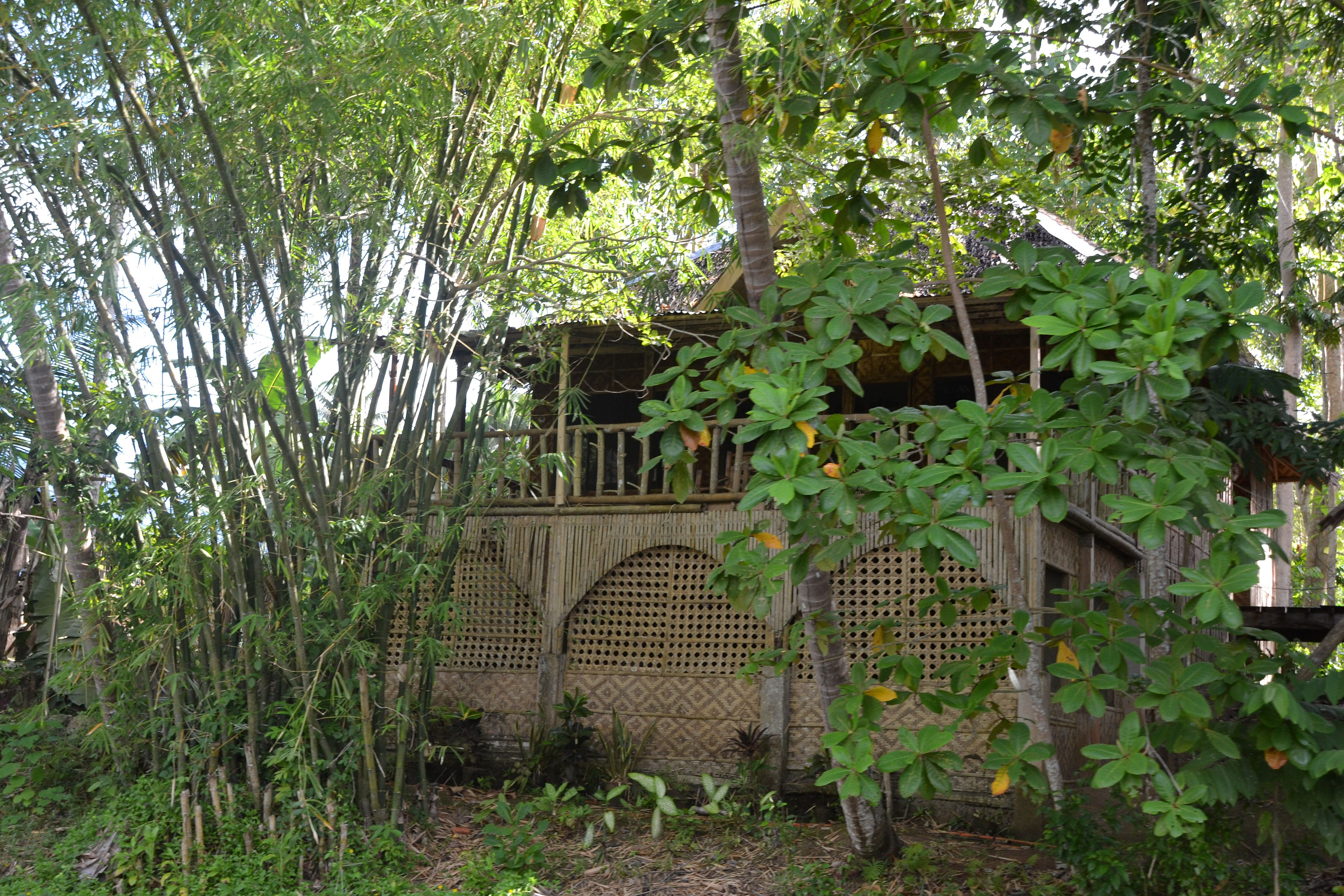
A traditional Filipino house with amakan walls in Bohol

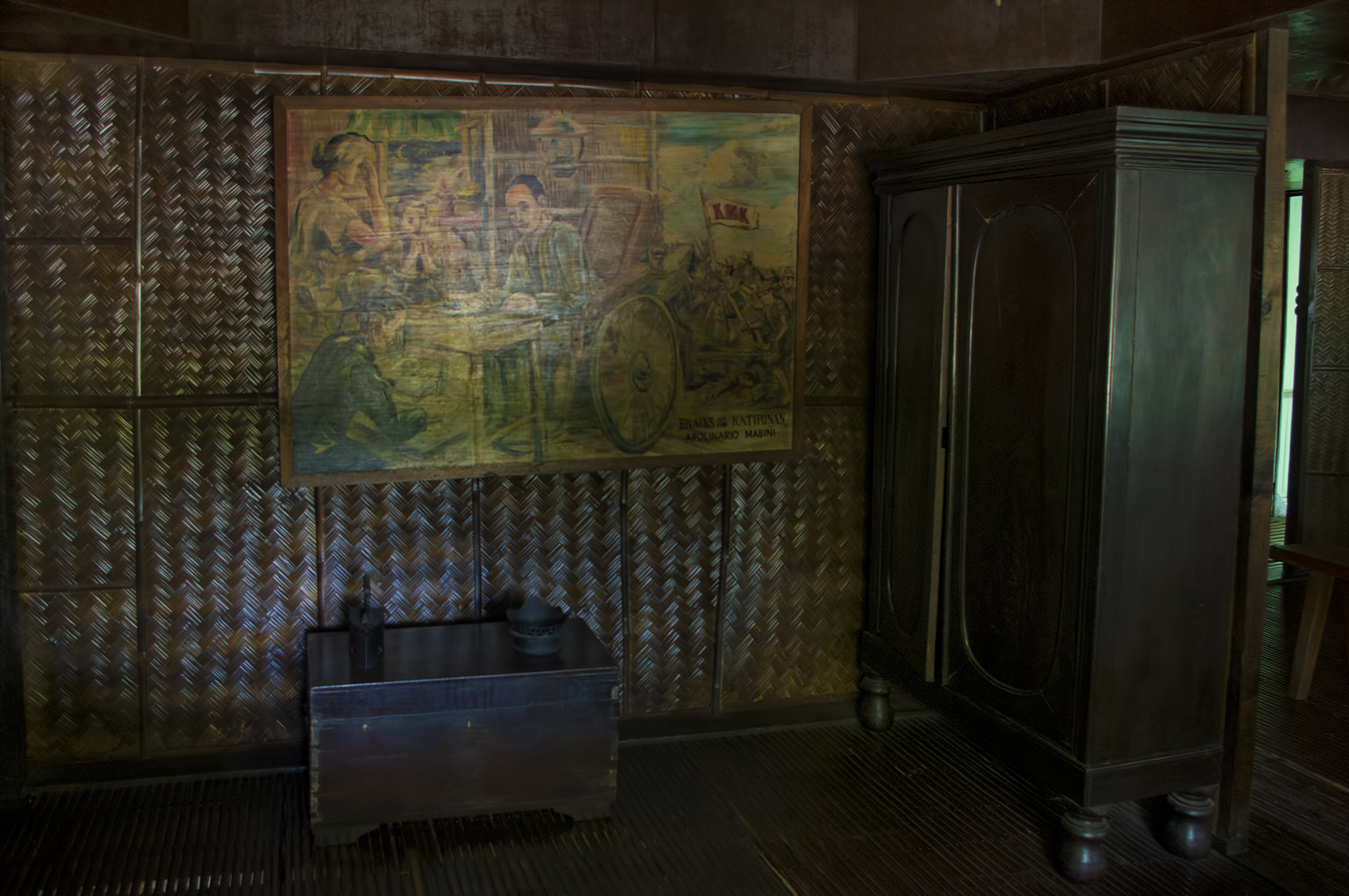
Sawali interior paneling in the Mabini Shrine, a traditional Filipino house (bahay kubo)

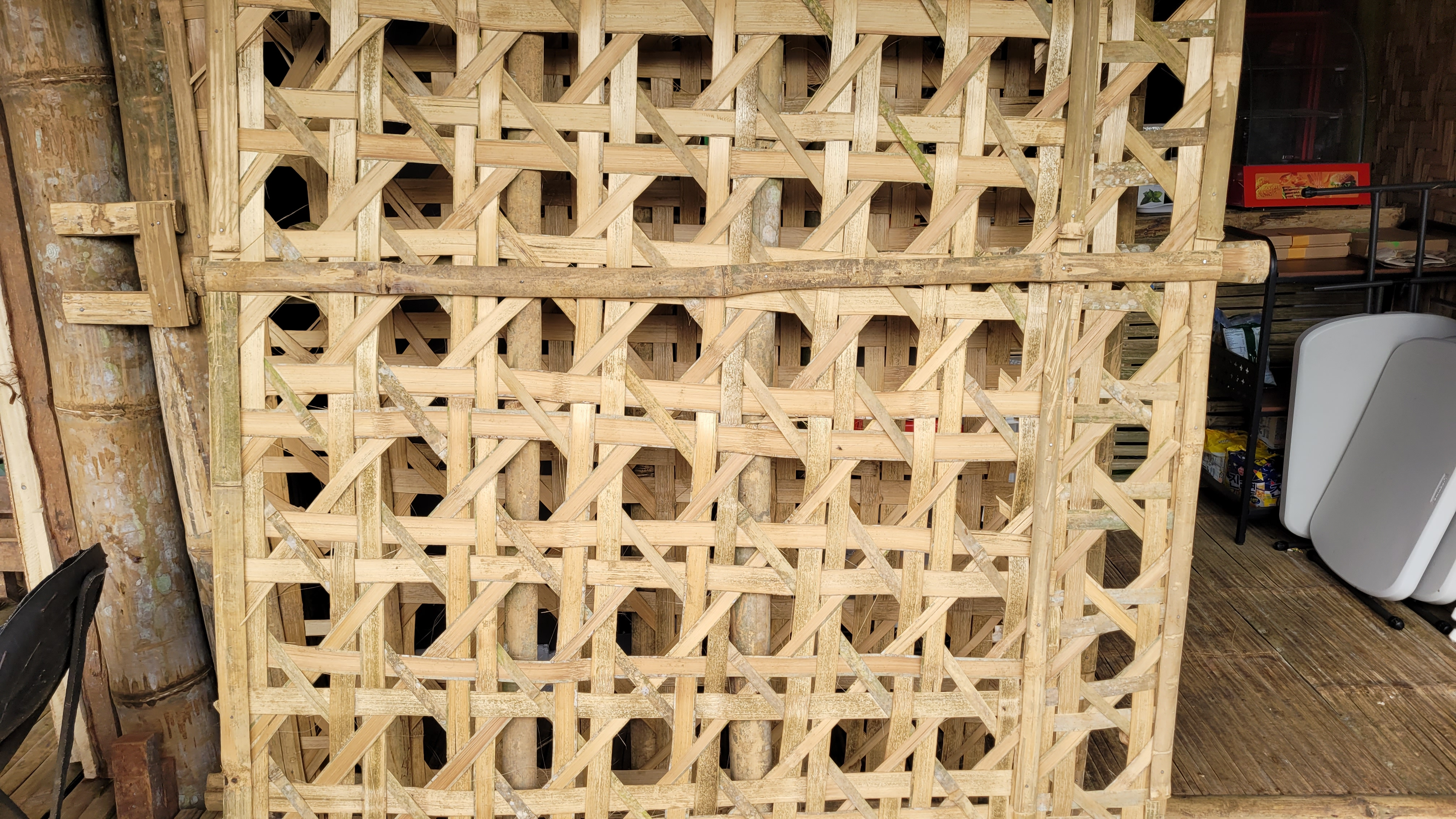
Amakan open-type weaving style (solihiya) used as grilles

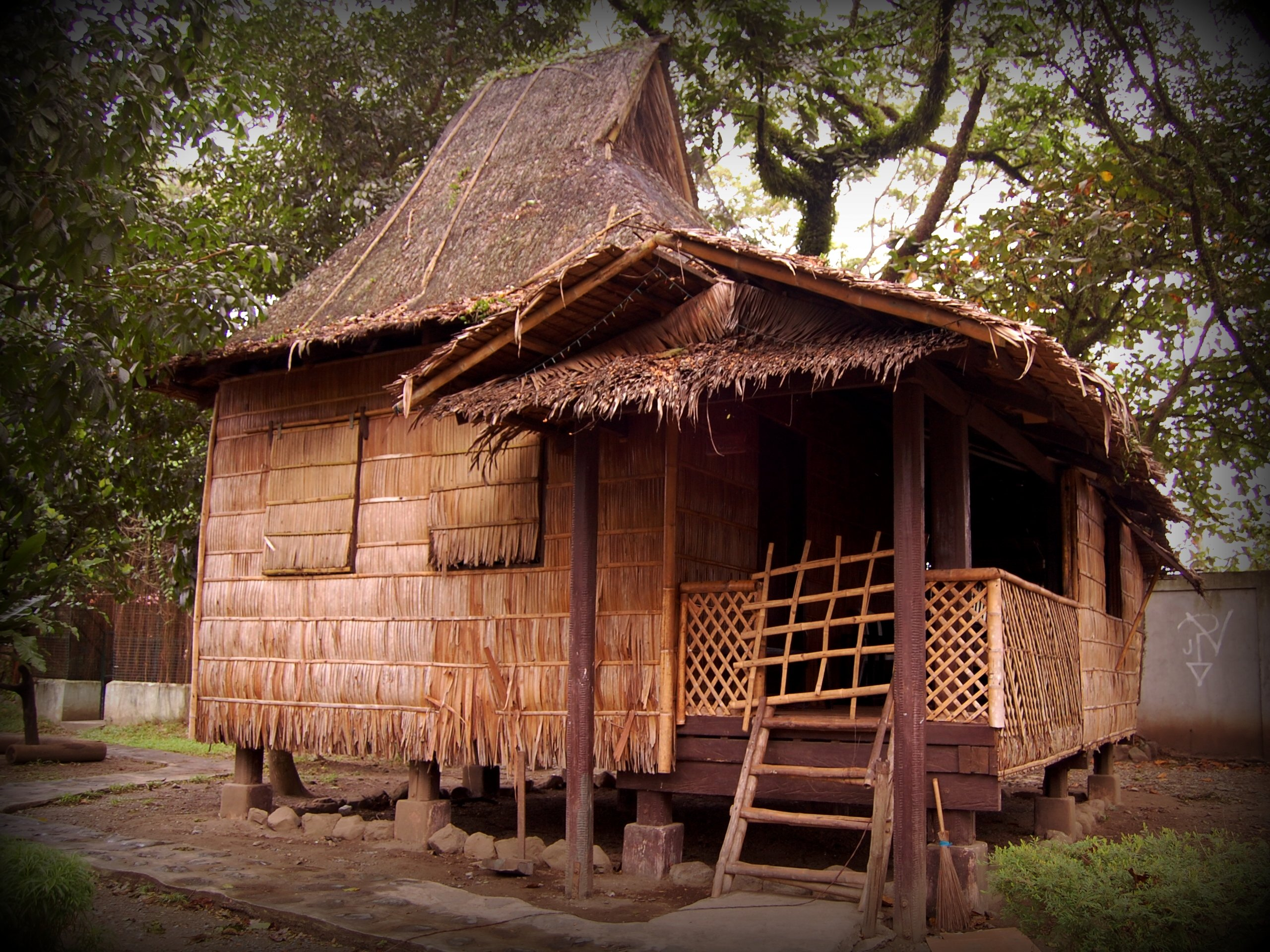
Preserved traditional house of President Manuel L. Quezon's parents in Baler, Aurora. It uses pawid (nipa thatch) as both roofing and walls.

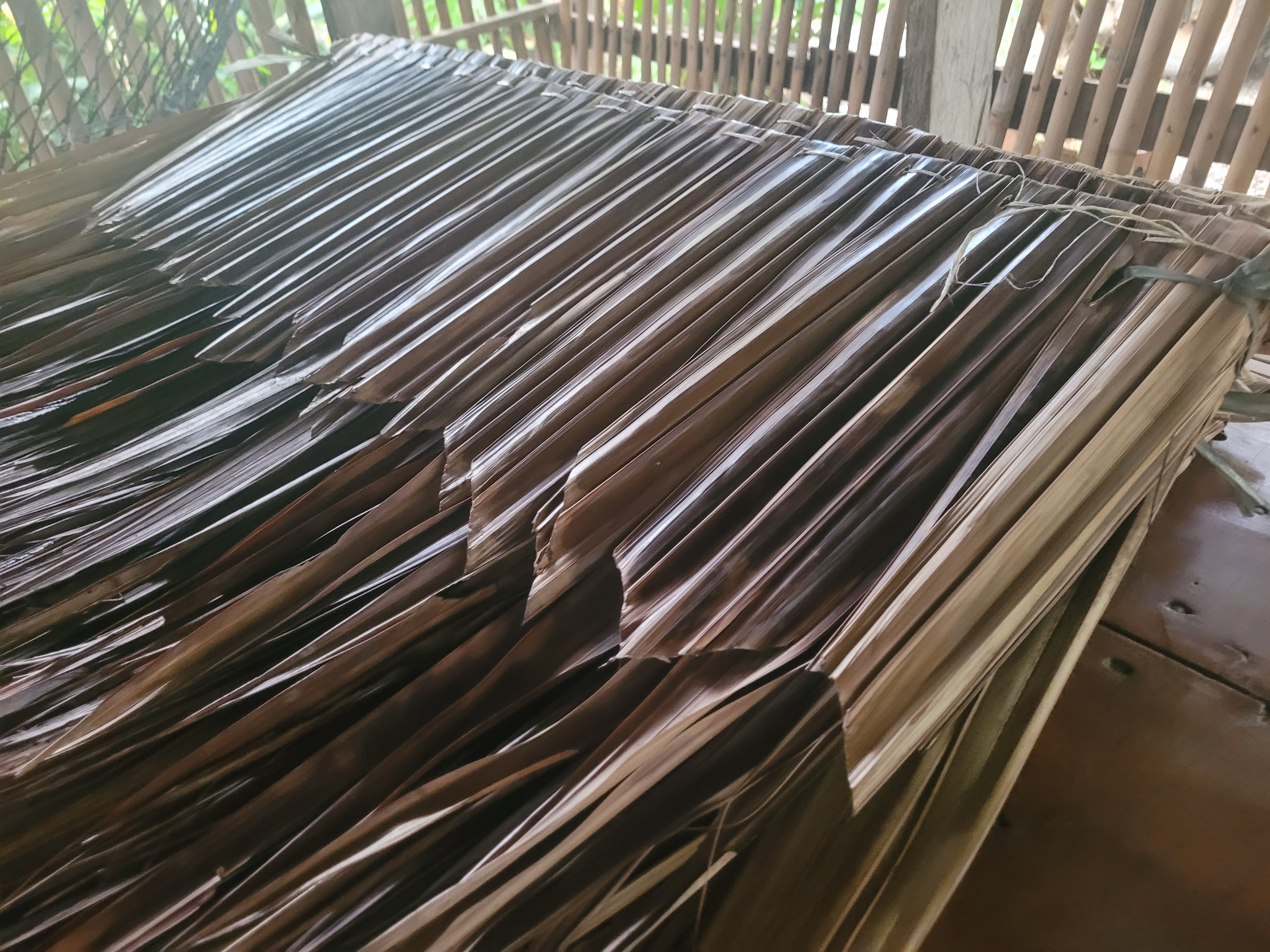
Thatched nipa palm leaf panels (pawid)

== See also ==
- Banig
- Rattan
