= Banig =

Handwoven mat used for sleeping and sitting

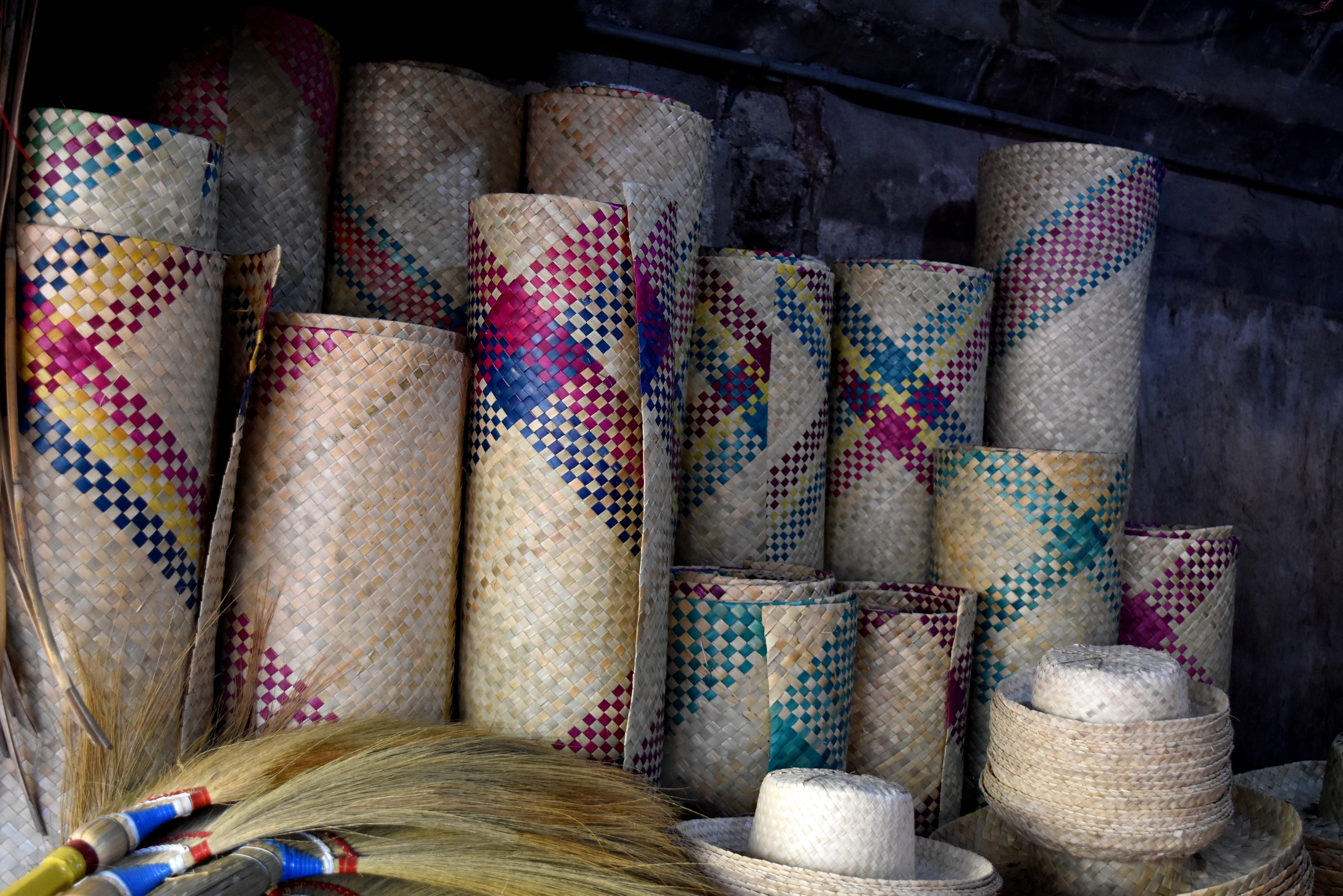
Banig in the Philippines sold with various other traditional handicrafts

Baníg (/bəˈnɪɡ/ bə-NIG; Tagalog: [bɐˈnɪɡ]) are traditional handwoven mats of the Philippines predominantly used as a sleeping mat or a floor mat. Banig mats are typically made from pandanus or sedge leaves. They can also utilize other materials, including buri palm leaves, reed leaves, and rattan strips, depending on the region and ethnic group. The leaves are dried, usually dyed, then cut into strips and woven into mats, which may be plain or intricate.

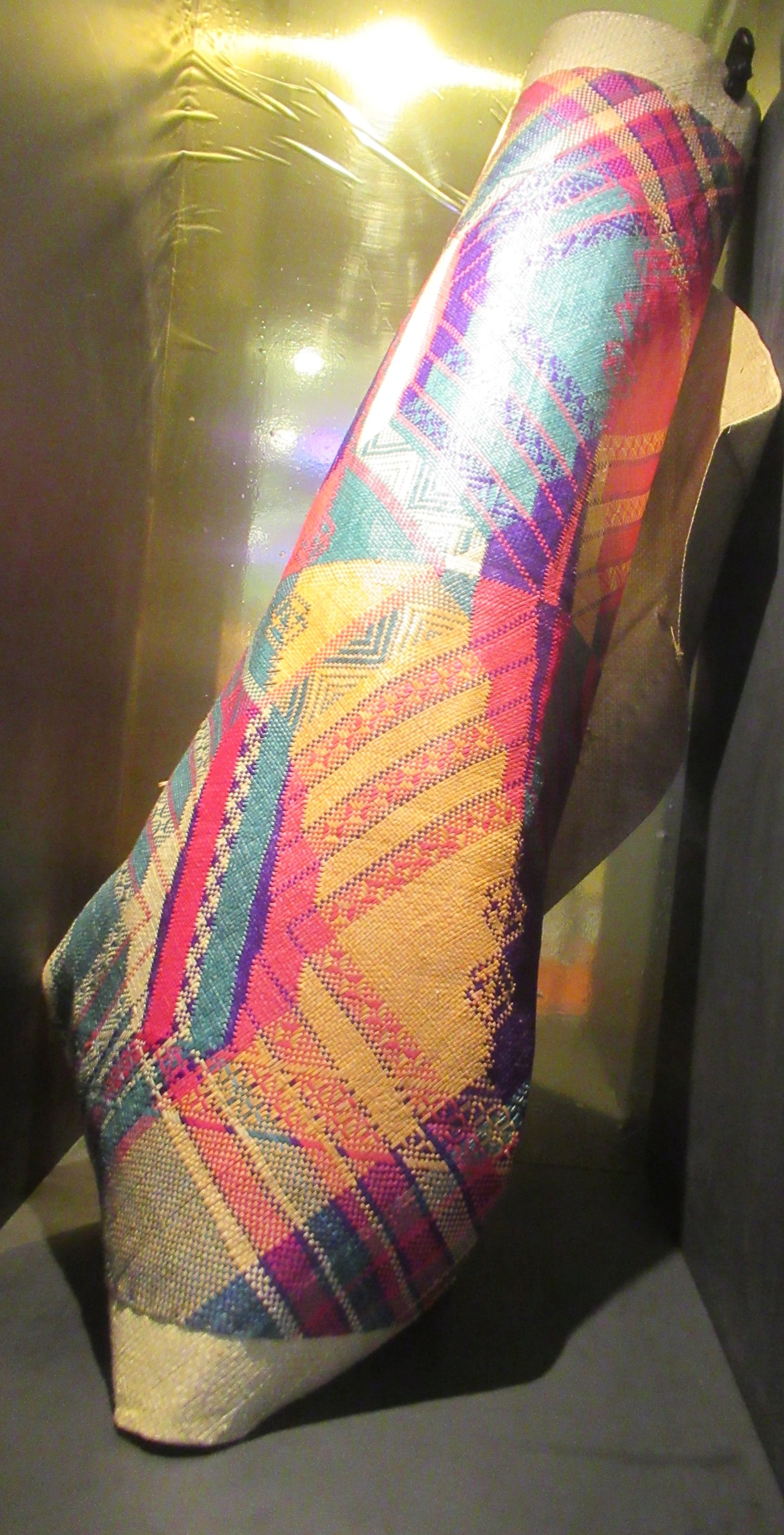
A Sama-Bajau tepo (the local Sinama word for banig) from Tandubas, by the Sama Tandubas master weaver Haja Amina Appi

Prior to the motorization of native bangka and other traditional Filipino sailing vessels, banig made from pandanus leaves were also the material used as traditional sails by Filipinos and other Austronesians due to the natural salt-resistant properties of pandanus and sedge leaves. They were also formerly used during the pre-colonial period to wrap the deceased prior to interment.

== Regional/ethnic styles ==
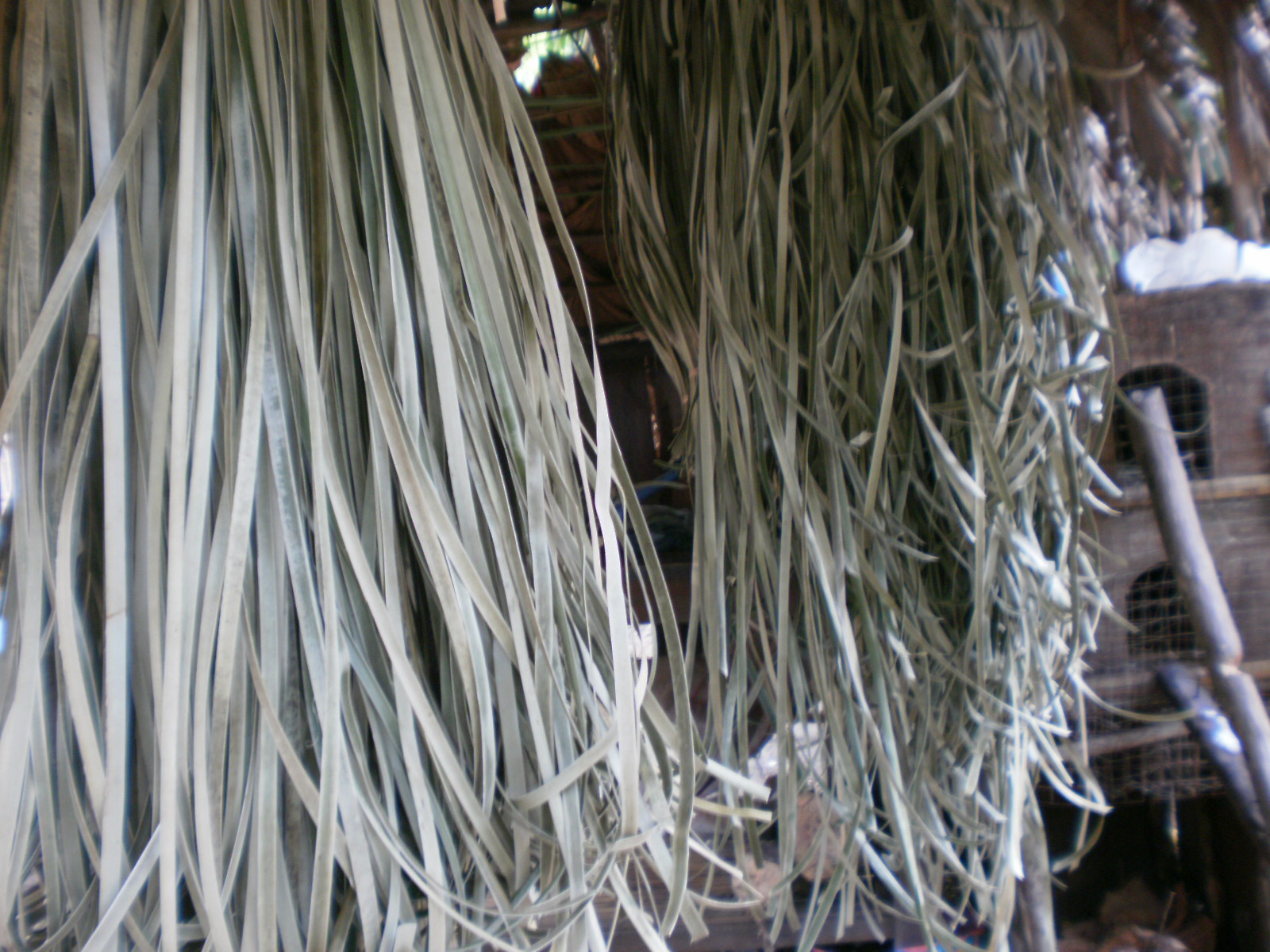
Karagumoy (Pandanus simplex) leaves being dried for weaving in Sorsogon

Most banig are made from pandanus leaves, specifically from the endemic Pandanus simplex (locally known as karagumoy, kalagimay, or karagamoi, among other names) or Pandanus tectorius (locally known as pandan, pangdan, or panhakad, among other names). Pandanus leaves are also used widely for other weaving traditions, including for bags and hats. But the type of material used for mats can vary by region and ethnic group.

=== Cebuano ===
Among the Cebuano people, mats are made from karagumoy. They typically come in two shades that are then woven into different patterns: the natural light brown color and a darker shade of brown. The darker shade is achieved by soaking the dried leaves in seawater for a few days. Soaking in seawater also makes the leaves resistant to insects.

=== Bukidnon ===
The Bukidnon-Tagoloanen people weave mats using sodsod (also spelled sud-sod or sudsud) sedge (Fimbristylis umbellaris). Not all the women in the tribe are taught how to weave the banig. Only the daughters with the sharpest mind and persistent attitude are taught how to weave ("lala"). The designs woven onto the banig are inspired from nature. The designs woven to this day have usually been learned from the mothers and grandmothers. The Bukidnon-Tagoloanen banig mats are notable for their intricate designs that are formed directly as the sedge leaves are woven together (and not inserted onto a finished blank mat). The Bukidnon weavers (or "maglalala") make circular and rectangular banig mats. "The Tagoloanen generally prefer three design forms or guwat...Tinulisan are diamonds, squares, and rectangles arranged in straight rows and columns; binakusan, those arranged diagonally; and bukanayo... or the repetition of small refined design details and arranging them into a crisp gridlike fashion." The Bukidnon-Tagoloanen mat weaving tradition almost died out, until it was revived in 2012 by the Tagolwanen Women Weavers Association (TWWA), formed to preserve and promote the weaving, as well as the traditions and customs that surround it.

=== Cordilleran ===
Among the Cordilleran people, mats are typically woven from rono reeds (Miscanthus sinensis), the same material also used for basket-weaving, fencing, and roofing. Rono reed mats are uneven and often uncomfortable, so they usually have another layer of soft bark strips woven on the upper layer. Cordilleran mats can also be used as a blanket due to the colder temperatures of the Cordilleran highlands.

=== Kinaray-a ===
Banig weaving in Panay Island — especially at the northwestern tip, in the municipalities of Nabas in Aklan and Libertad in Antique, is a long-standing traditional craft locally known as Pagrara it Banig, where artisans create both functional mats and various woven products. The artistry of these weavers is highlighted during the annual Bariw Festival in Nabas and the Banigan Festival in Libertad. It primarily uses the bariw (pandanus leaves), which is carefully dried and woven into mats. The process is intricate, involving 14 stages such as pagsasa (stripping), pagbulad (drying), pagpalpag (beating), and pagrara (weaving). Recognized as a heritage practice, the skill has been passed down through generations. Many elders believe weaving is best done during the rainy season, when the bariw becomes softer and easier to handle. This craft serves as an important source of livelihood for residents.

=== Maguindanao/Maranao ===
Among the Maguindanao and Maranao people, banig are typically woven from sesed (Fimbristylis miliacea), which is abundant in the floodplains of Cotabato and in Lake Lanao. They are predominantly used for sleeping mats and for drying rice.

Maranao and Bukidnon mats share the unique round-shaped mats. Maranao round mats often feature spiraling designs.

=== Pangasinense ===
Among the Pangasinan people, mats are woven from buri palm leaves. Pangasinan mats are typically double-layered, with a plain lower layer and a patterned upper layer.

=== Romblomanon ===
Among the Romblomanon people, mats are woven from buri palm leaves and are unique in having delicate lace-like borders. They are specifically only used in weddings, where they serve as a traditional floor liner during the dance of the wedded couple.

=== Sama-Bajau ===
The banig of the Sama-Bajau people of Tawi-Tawi and Sulu is known as tepo. Like other Filipino ethnic groups, they typically use Pandanus simplex leaves. The patterns used vary within specific Sama-Bajau groups. The most common patterns are stripes, multi-colored squares, checkered patterns, and zigzags. Two islands are specifically renowned for mat-weaving: Laminusa Island of Siasi, Sulu; and Unggus Matata Island of Tandubas, Tawi-Tawi. Both have weavers that have been awarded the National Living Treasures Award, including Haja Amina Appi.

Sama-Bajau mats are typically very colorful due to the use of dyes. The mats from the Laminusa are typically softer in texture and color, because the leaves are beaten during the preparation, in contrast, the mats woven from Unggus Matata are less pliable but more vibrant in color. Sama-Bajau mats have also started appearing in Kota Kinabalu, due to populations of Sama-Bajau who migrated to Sabah to escape the piracy and conflict in their home islands.

Sama-Bajau mats are also frequently used as wall decorations.

=== Tagbanwa ===
The Tagbanwa of Palawan uniquely weave banig from rattan strips. This makes their mats the most durable out of all types of banig. Their weaving techniques are similar to those of the Sama-Bajau of Tawi-Tawi and the Dayak people of Borneo. They also typically use the mats as wall decorations rather than for sleeping.

=== Tausug ===
Among the Tausug people of Sulu are similar to Sama-Bajau designs in being linear or geometrical. They typically borrow designs from woven textiles. In modern times, a lot of the banig once prominently used in local mosques have been replaced by imported rugs.

=== Tboli ===
Among the Tboli people of Lake Sebu, mats are typically woven from a local reed species that closely resemble bamboo strips and are much more durable than other types of banig. Most Tboli mats are uncolored, though a few may be dyed.

=== Waray ===
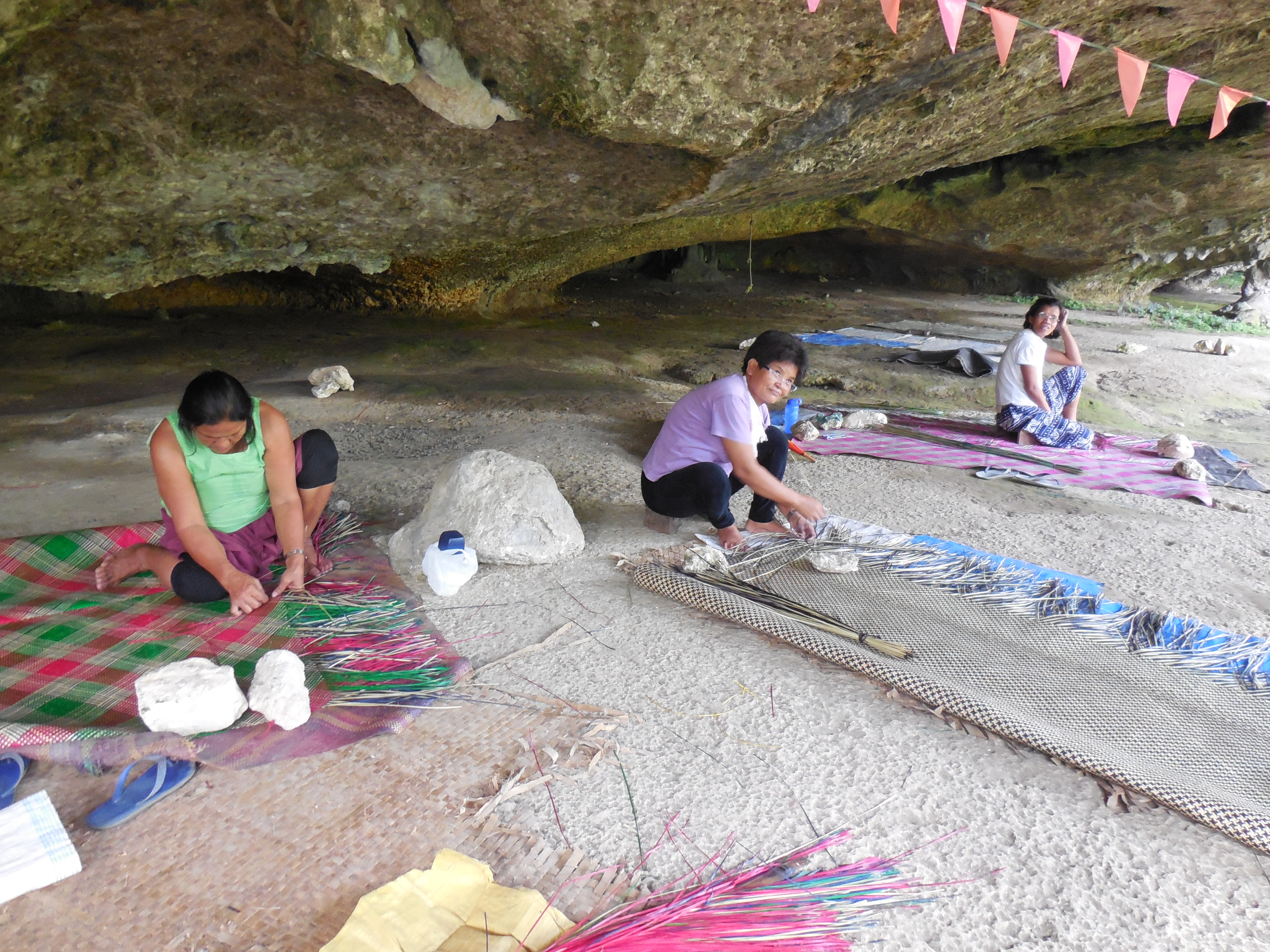
Women weaving banig at Saob Cave in Basey, Samar

The banig of the Waray people of Basey, Samar is made of tikog leaves (Fimbristylis umbellaris). In 2020, a Samar solon seek for its Banig industry by supporting the tikog industry. As of March 8, 2024, the Basey Association for Native Industry Growth (BANIG) has conducts its 10 year anniversary inviting the public and private sectors to join the said activity and to witness the search of miss banig 2024.

== Festivals ==
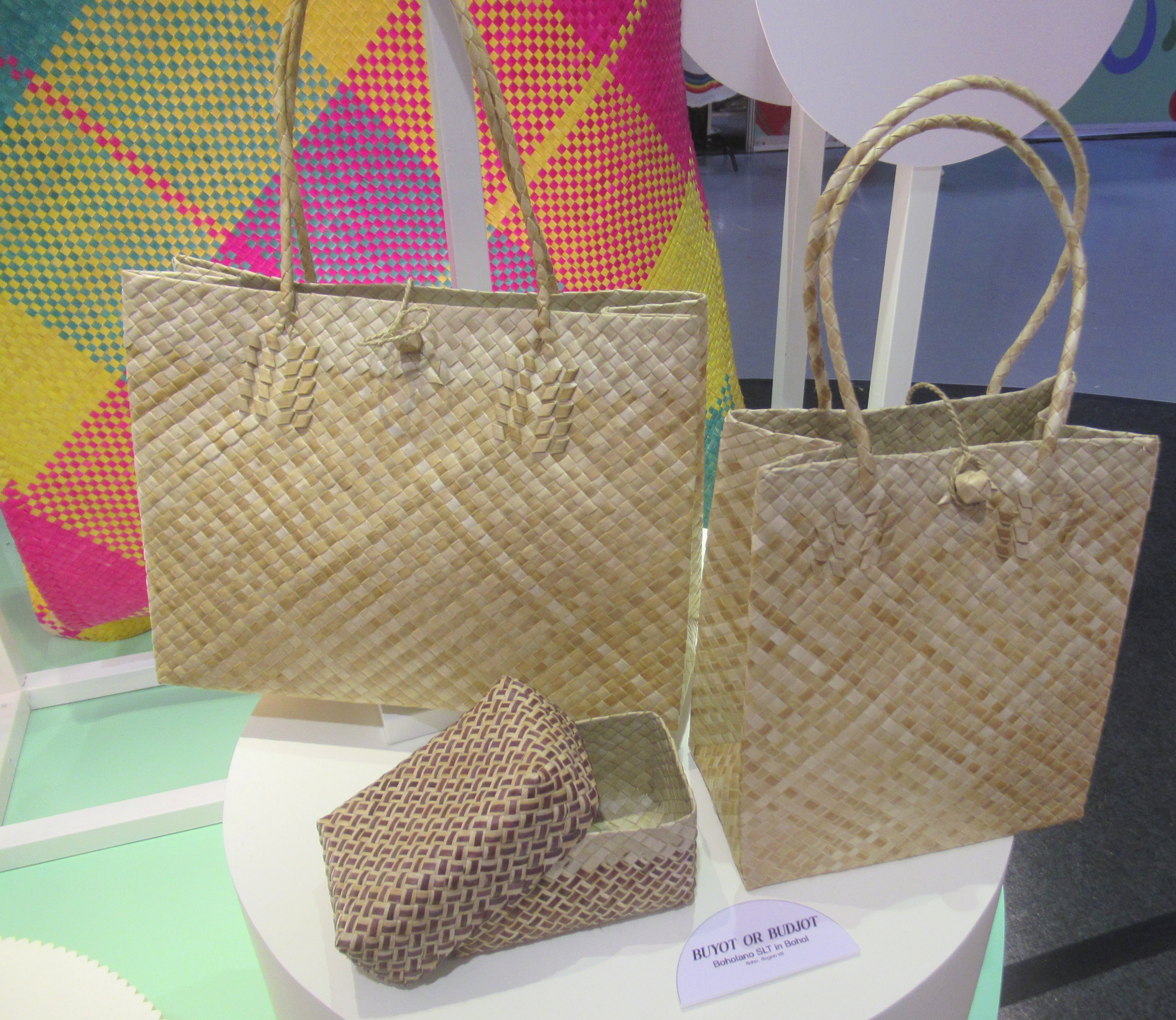
Banig and bags made from karagumoy in Bohol

=== Banig Festival ===
In celebration of Badian's annual fiesta, the Banig Festival showcases the town's various handicrafts and culture, focusing specifically on the native handwoven mats made from Banig. This festival, which is observed every 3 July, is in honor of the town's patron saint, St. James the Great and includes street dancing with costumes made using Banig material, a trade fair showcasing the banig and other native products, and a banig-making contest.

=== Banigan Festival (Antique) ===
Banig products has since gained importance prompting local officials and Libertadnons to establish the Banigan Festival to promote banig and sub-products of banig as their One-town-One Product (OTOP). The festival also aims to encourage the banig weavers that the banig they produced could possibly turn into a highly valuable item that can be known not only in the province but also in the international market.

The Banigan festival is very popular for its banig weaving demonstration to visitors and tourists. Varieties of hats, bags, slippers and gowns made of banig are also exhibited during the festival. The celebration is also a tribute to the town's mat weavers who have preserved the priceless tradition of their forefathers.

=== Banigan Festival (Guimaras) ===
Barangay Sapal, San Lorenzo, Guimaras has its own Banigan Festival every 15 April, celebrating the use of 'banig' or dried pandan leaves as mats and various handicrafts.

It is one of 10 barangay (or village-level) fiestas observed in Guimaras, aside from the Bayuhan, Kadagatan, Karosahan, Layagan, Niyogyogan, Pangasi, Rosas Sa Baybayon, Sarangola, and Sibiran festivals.

=== Buri Festival ===
Buri (Corypha elata), is the official product of San Juan, Ilocos Sur registered under the One Town One Product (OTOP) program of President Gloria Macapagal Arroyo. Also known as century plant and locally as silag, buri is a palm from which three kinds of fibres (buri, raffia, and buntal) are obtained. The buri palm has large fan-shaped leaves with stout petioles ranging from 2 to 3 m (7 to 10 ft) in length. The palm reaches a height of 20 to 40 m (66 to 131 ft), and its trunk has a diameter of 1 to 1.5 m (3 to 5 ft).

On January 3, 2006 during the holding of the First Buri Festival, thousands of Ilocanos queued along the streets with the 2.4-kilometre-long (1.5 mi) and 1-metre-wide (3.3 ft) buri mat. Residents consider it "a symbol of their undying love for the cottage industry that they proudly call their own." Though short of the earlier target of weaving a 4-kilometre (2.5 mi) buri mat, the town surpass the country's unpublished world record of the longest mat woven in Basey, Samar six years prior.

=== Banigan-Kawayan Festival ===
On September 20, 2000, hundreds of people paraded a more than 1-kilometre-long (0.6 mi) mat as a highlight of Basey town's Banigan-Kawayan Festival. The one-meter-wide mat was woven for several weeks. However, the feat was not submitted as an entry to the Guinness Book of World Records.

San Juan Mayor Benjamin Sarmiento said that they failed to achieve their target of a 4-kilometre-long (2.5 mi) mat because street dancers and parade revelers used up a great deal of the raw materials for their costumes. Councilor Proceso Ochosa said that the First Buri Festival was meant to promote the buri industry in the local and world markets:

The launching of the longest mat is the highlight of our buri festival this year and would be staged annually with the inspiration to get the distinction of having woven the world's longest mat and promote buri to the world market.

Buri palm trees are abundant in baranggays (villages) Cacandongan, Darao, Malammin, Caronoan, Camanggaan, Immayos Norte and Barbar. Of the 32 barangays in San Juan, half of them are engaged in the buri industry, leading officials to want the town named the "Buri Capital" of the Philippines.

=== Karagumoy Festival ===
Karagumoy Festival is celebrated in the coastal town of Bacacay in Albay province every August 29-30 annually.

== Use in tourism slogan ==
It's more fun in the Philippines (2012–present)

MORE FUN. The tourism campaign line for international audience.
HASHTAG FUN. The tourism campaign line for domestic use.

The two logos feature a pixelized version of a "banig" or a handwoven mat traditionally used for sleeping and sitting. Within the pixels is the Philippine map embedded in yellow.

== See also ==
- Amakan
- Haja Amina Appi
- Katoaga
- Pusô
