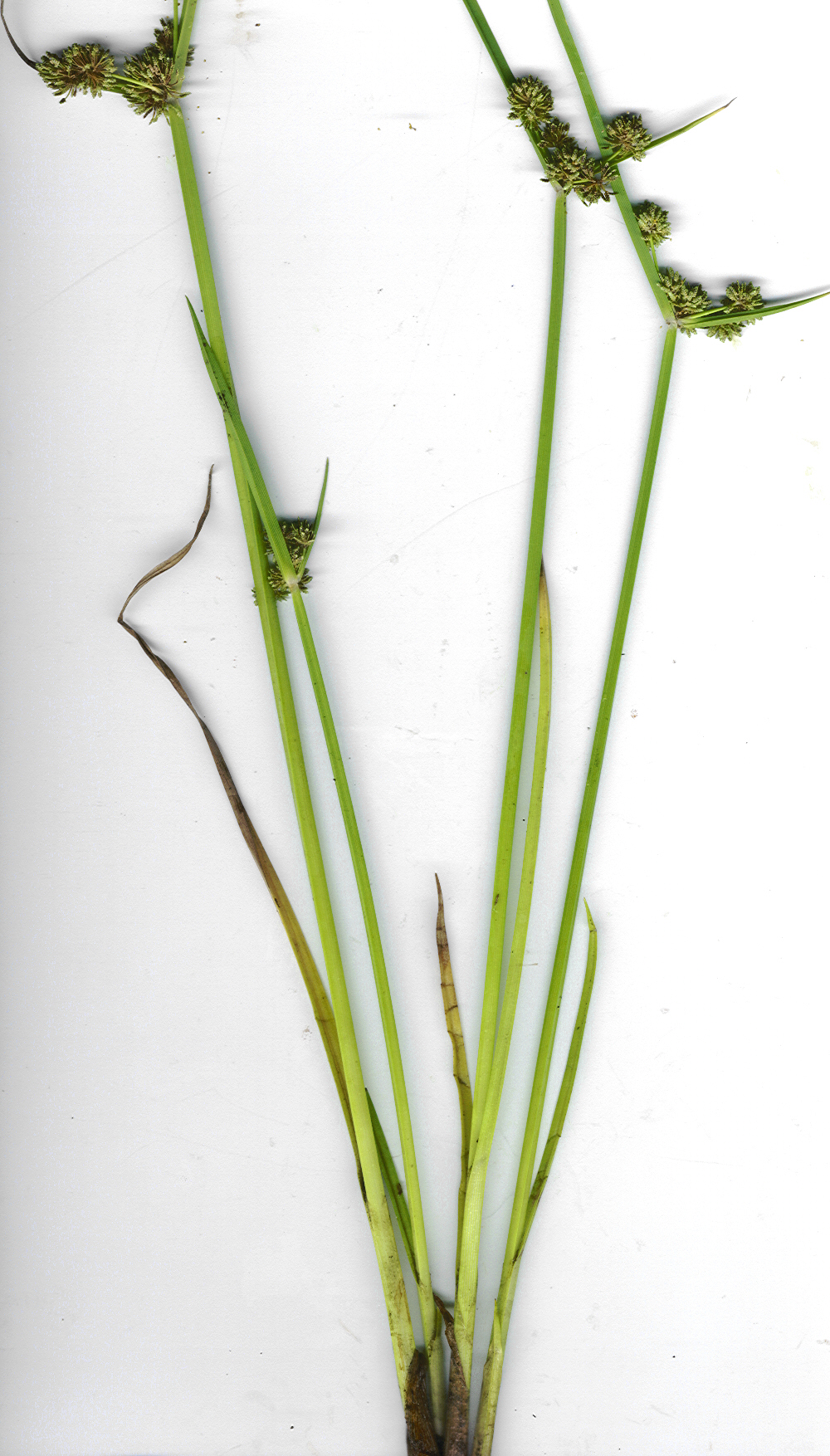

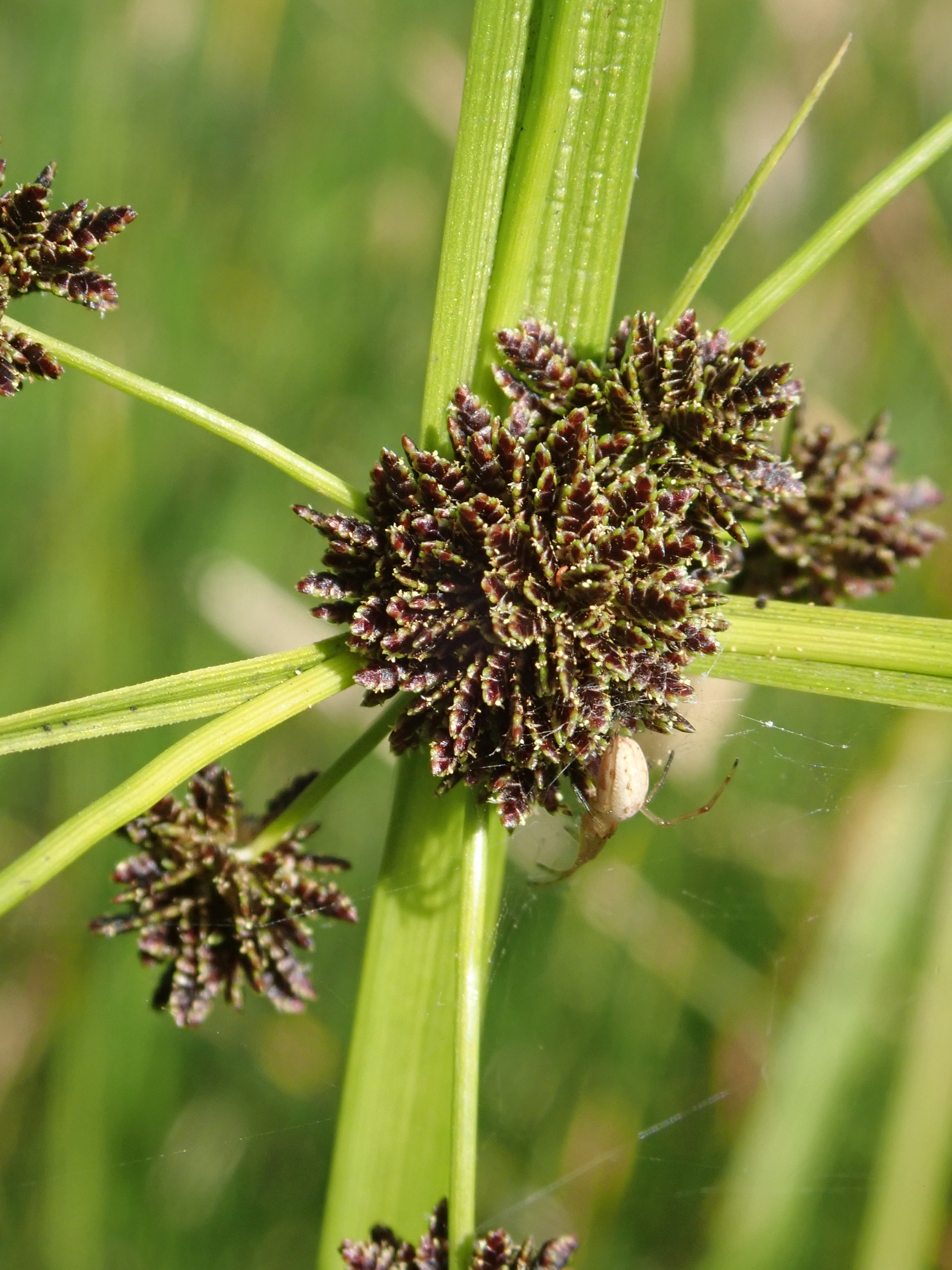

Scientific classification
- Kingdom: Plantae
- Clade: Tracheophytes
- Clade: Angiosperms
- Clade: Monocots
- Clade: Commelinids
- Order: Poales
- Family: Cyperaceae
- Genus: Cyperus
- Species: C. difformis

Binomial name
- Cyperus difformis L.
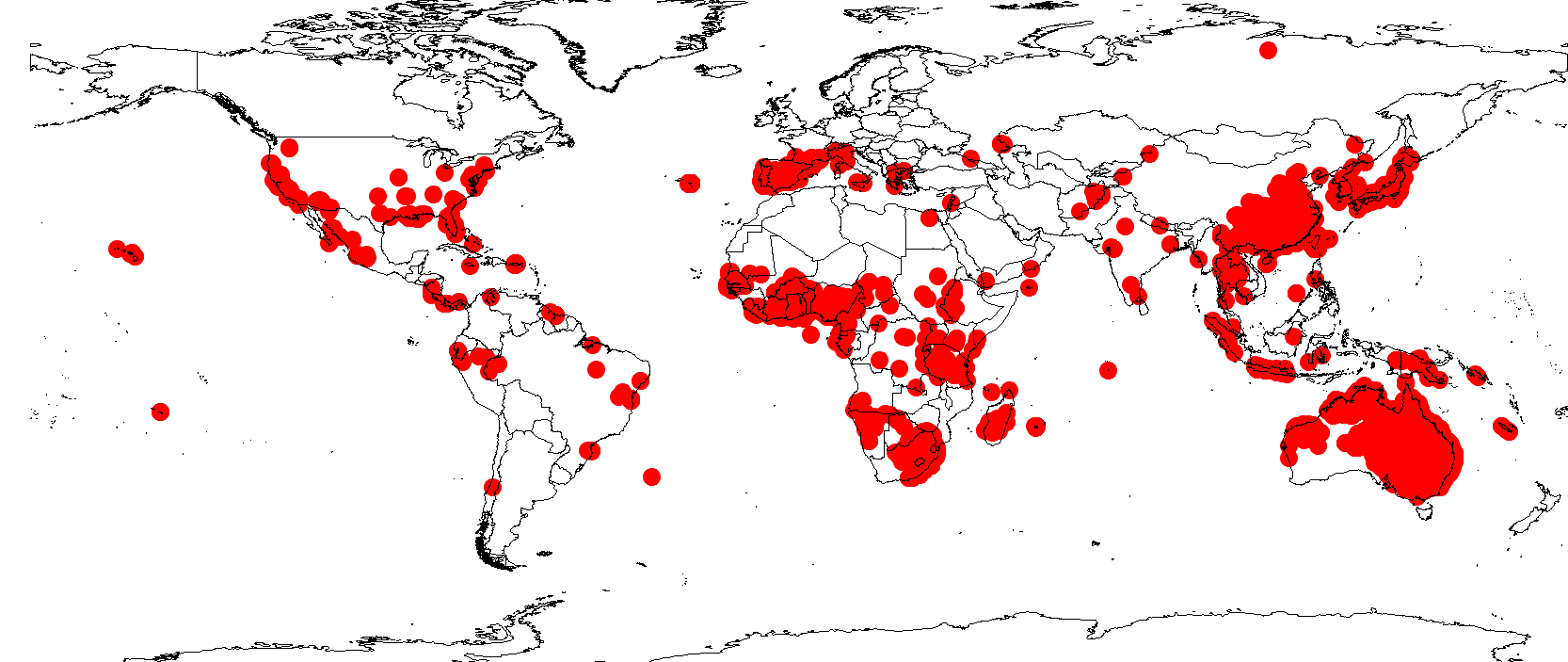
- Occurrence data from GBIF

Synonyms
- Cyperus lateriflorus Torr. 1859, illegitimate homonym, not Steud. 1829; Cyperus protractus Link 1821, illegitimate homonym, not Delile 1813; Cyperus viridis Willd. ex Kunth 1837, illegitimate homonym, not Krock. 1787 nor Sieber ex C. Presl 1828 nor Roxb. ex C.B. Clarke 1884; Cyperus holoschoenoides Jan ex Schult.; Cyperus subrotundus Llanos; Cyperus goeringii Steud.; Cyperus oryzetorum Steud.

= Cyperus difformis =

Species of plant

Cyperus difformis is a species of sedge known by several common names, including variable flatsedge, smallflower umbrella-sedge and rice sedge. This plant is native to southern Europe, most of Africa and Asia, and Australia, and it is naturalized in other areas of the world, including large parts of the Americas.

Cyperus difformis is a plant of aquatic and moist habitats. It is a weed of rice fields, but not generally a troublesome one. This is an annual herb with one to many thin, soft erect stems reaching over 30 centimeters in maximum height. There are usually a few long, wispy leaves around the base of the plant. The inflorescence is a rounded bundle one to three centimeters wide, containing up to 120 spikelets, each long and partially or entirely covered in up to 30 bracted flowers. The flowers are light brown with areas darker brown and sometimes a yellowish or purplish tint.

== Similar Species ==
C. difformis can be distinguished from most visually similar species by the small size of the glumes, 0.5-0.7 x 0.5 mm, resembling tiny slightly elongated blunt beads.
