= Woven mat =

A woven mat is a type of mat that is created by weaving and may include:

- Sawali, woven split bamboo mats used in the Philippines to construct walls
- Tule shoe, mat of woven reeds wired to a horse shoe
- ‘ie toga, finely woven mat with high cultural value in Samoa
- Carrick mat, flat woven decorative knot which can be used as a mat or pad
- Makisu, mat woven from bamboo and cotton string that is used in Japanese food preparation
- Tatami, a flooring material in traditional Japan, often of woven rush
- Banig, handwoven mat usually used in East Asia and Philippines for sleeping
- Reed mat (craft), handmade mats of plaited reed
- Cadjan, a type of home in Asia
