= Casa da Câmara =

Former seat of local government in Porto, Portugal

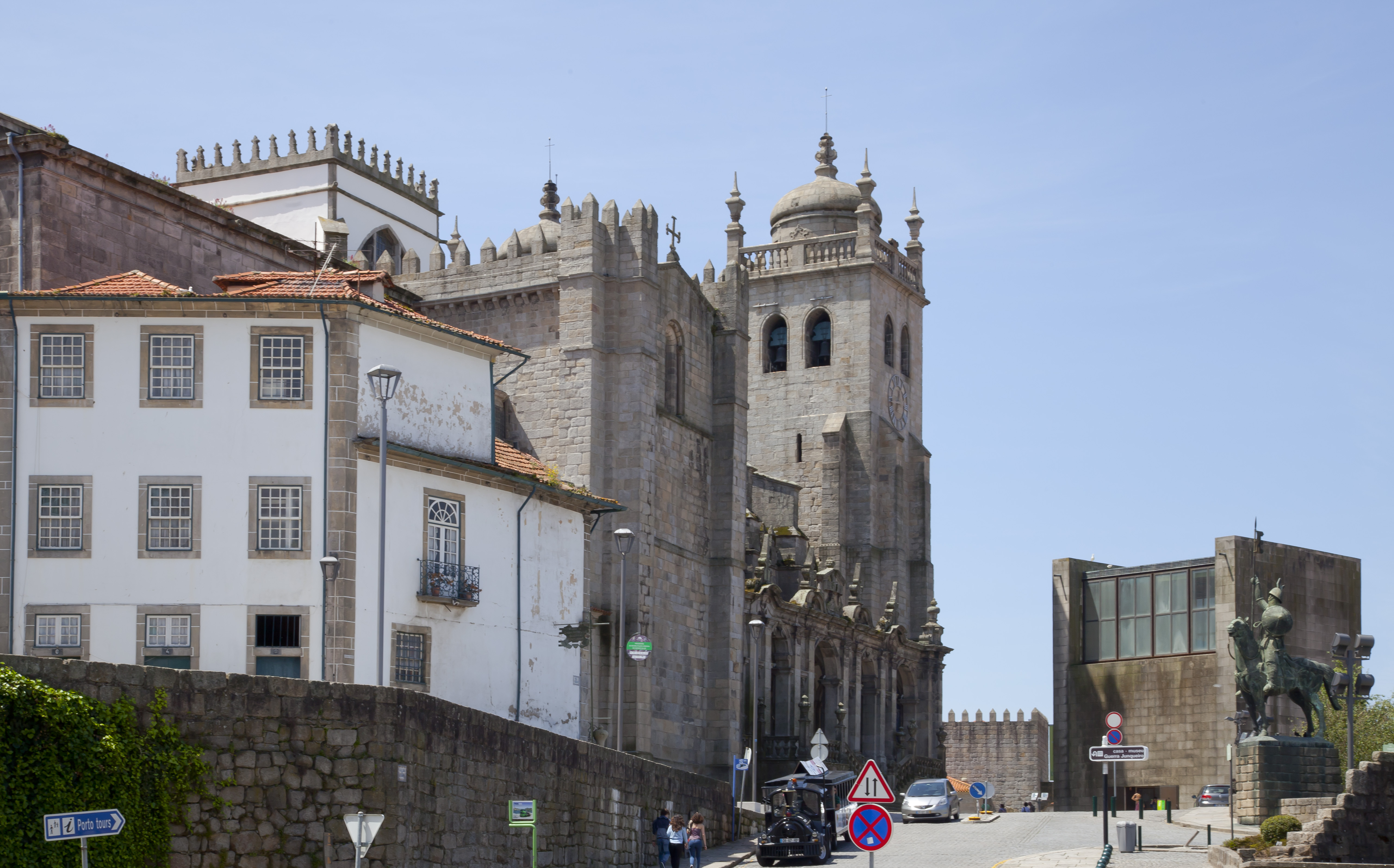
- A view of the hilltop of architectural patrimony, that includes the Sé Cathedral (left) and the tower that served as the old municipal house (right)
- Interactive map of the Casa da Câmara area

General information
- Type: Municipal council
- Location: Cedofeita, Santo Ildefonso, Sé, Miragaia, São Nicolau e Vitória, Portugal
- Coordinates: 41°8′35″N 8°36′42″W
- Owner: Câmara Municipal do Porto

Technical details
- Material: Granite

The Casa da Câmara (literally, the old Municipal House) is a former-administrative building located in the civil parish of Cedofeita, Santo Ildefonso, Sé, Miragaia, São Nicolau e Vitória, in the municipality of Porto, in northern Portugal.

== History ==
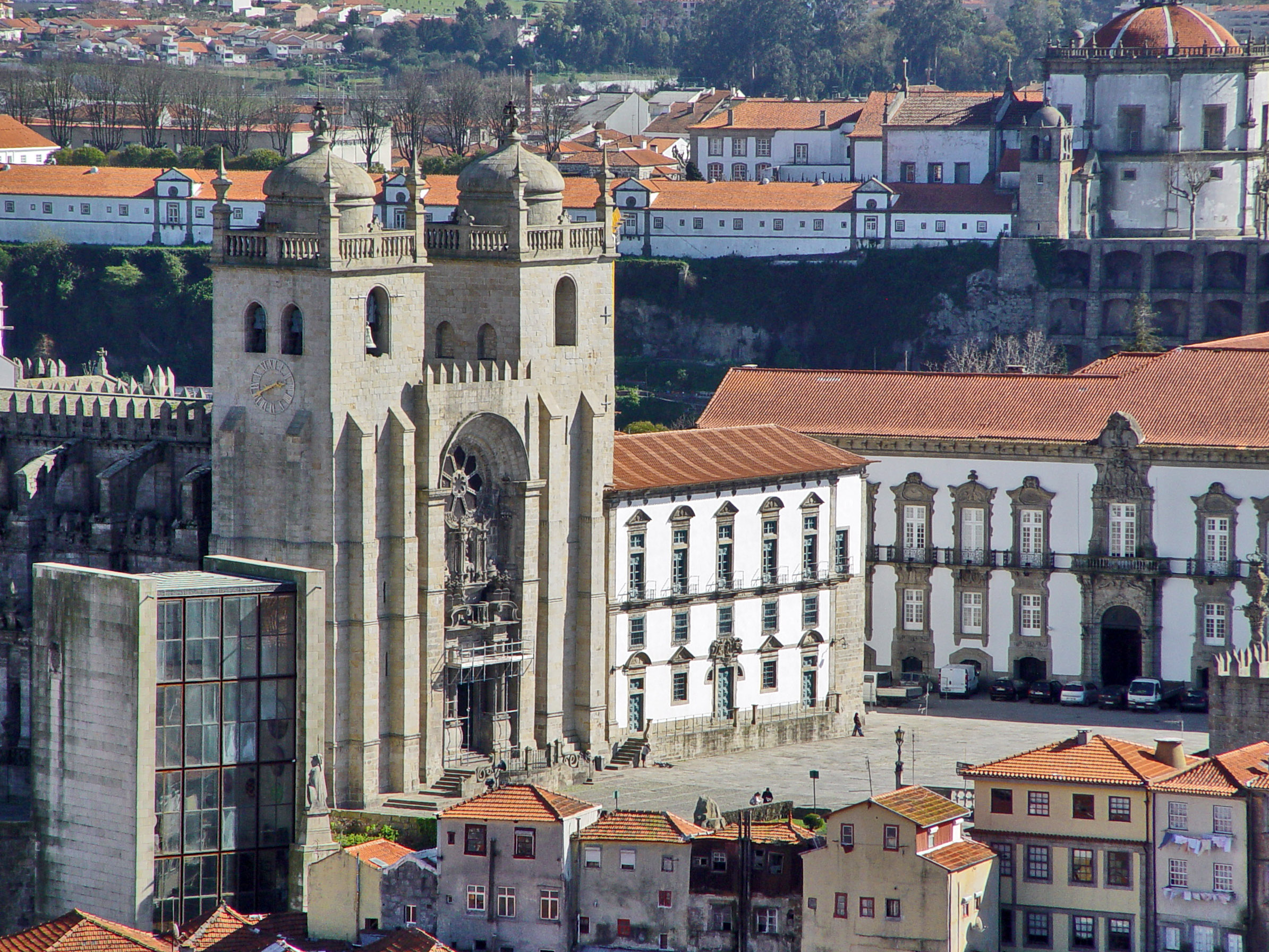
A view of the hilltop Gothic architecture and square, including the Casa da Câmara (left)

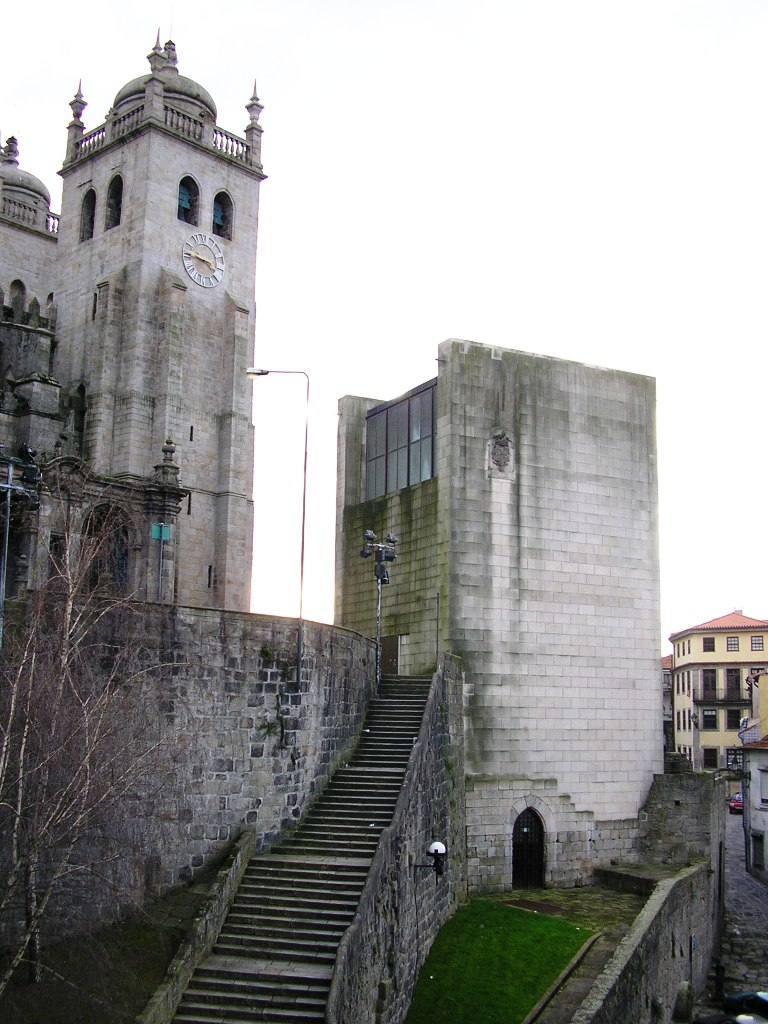
The tower and staircase to the Casa da Câmara

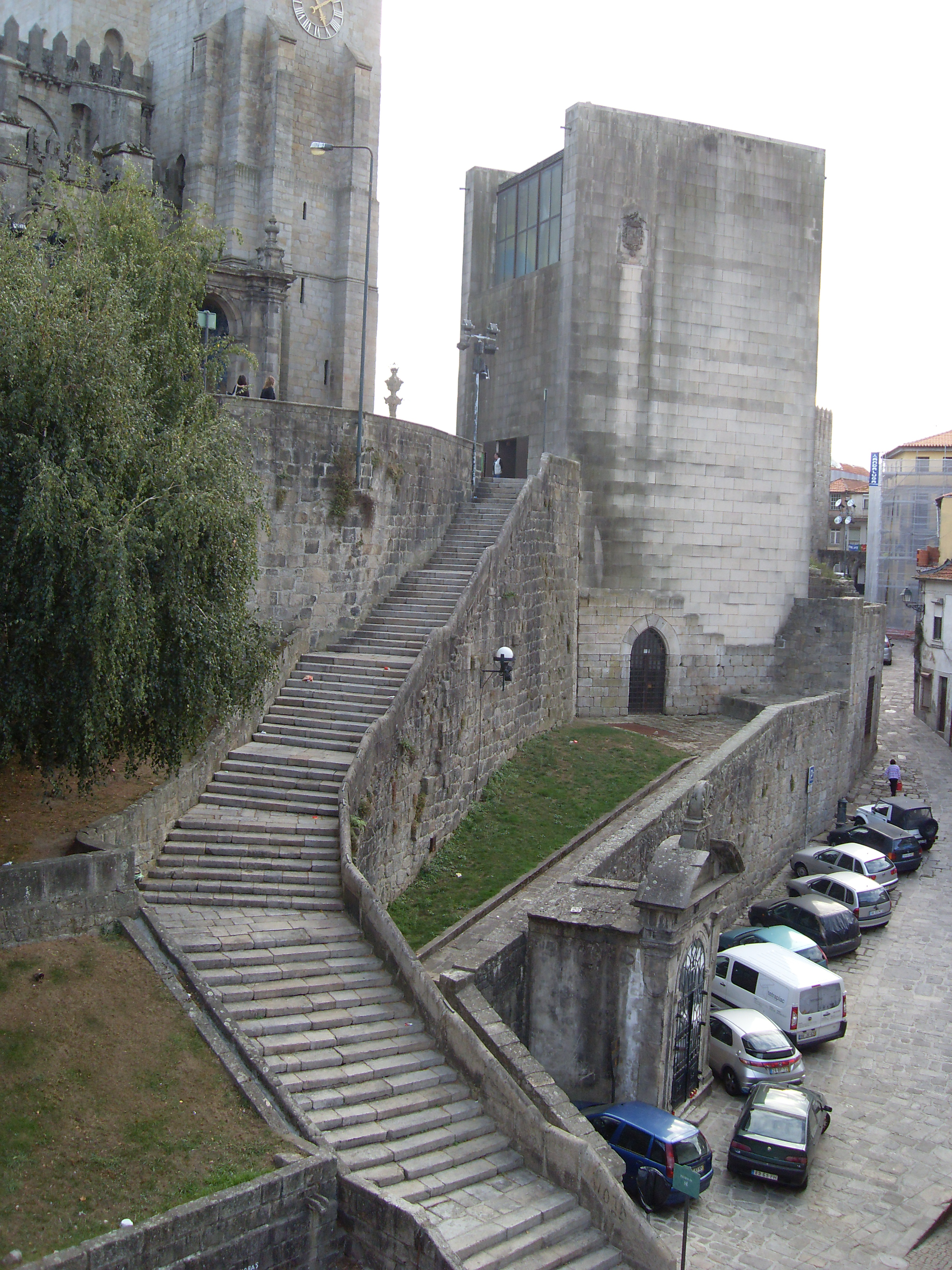
The main staircase and the three floors

Before 1350, the municipal senate functioned in a small, wooden house alongside the Sé Cathedral.

The building, known as the Paço de Arcos (Palace of Arches) was constructed in 1360 by the municipal council, with pre-authorization of the Corregidor of the Comarca, in the cathedral courtyard. It is assumed that, due to an error in the construction of the pillars that supported the old wall, fell into ruin, in addition to adjacent buildings and part of the wall. As a consequence, municipal activities began function from the terrace of the Convent of São Domingos.

Sometime between 1439 and 1443, another construction operated for the administrative purposes after the Paços dos Arcos; at this time the meeting minutes referred to as Sobrado de Relaçou, Paço do Concelho or, even, Paço da Rolação, constructed of stonework, trimmed along the battlements, with access through Largo da Sé. That year, a contract was signed with the municipal council and carpenter Gonçalo Domingues, to execute a project in the new house/tower. The council committed to provide 200 bull-carriages loaded with wood and other materials, acquired from Maia, Refojos, Aguiar and Penafiel de Sousa. Documents from the time, identified the stonework had a principal facade oriented to the Sé Cathedral (70 palms high) while the other facade looked to the Rua de São Sebastião (100 palms tall). The carpenters contract showed that the second floor was at level with the cathedral's courtyard, open to:

"...a door, with three steps, which was the entranceway to the noble hall of the Palace e provided access to a large hall, dividing in the middle into two chambers by partition...[there] were bunks and booths, along with a lower floor, known as the House Auditorium or Foral of the Municipality."

The roof of the noble hall was similar to that at the Castle of São Jorge in Lisbon.

"While the door that opened to the Sé was executed with Moorish labour, very well built and worked, with its lock and fixtures in iron. This floor came to function as the provisional seat of the Relação and House of Porto. While, the lower floor, Auditorium Hall, is lamps and desks, they also existed, evidently, for its magistrates, had in its front da wood lining of quite high, so that no one would possibly read its writings. The ground floor had two doors at the level of "Rua de São Sebastião". At this floor was a rented space."

From the writings of Luís O. Ramos, the shop:

"...housed the council warehouse, where they stored part of the important arms and munitions that they acquired for the defense of the city. The remaining arms deposits were kept in the "Olivial Gate" and at the "Fort of Porta Nova". The first was used as an audience hall for the Juiz de fora and councilmen fulfilling their judicial functions. It also had space for audiences of the Corregidor of the Comarca and the Juiz de fora for orphans...On the second, accessible by wood stairs, was installed the Hall of the Senate, where they realized sessions of the municipal chamber. The walls were decorated in painted panels on wood and canvas. In the centre, the largest, behind the great table of the Senate were oil paintings of "Our Lady with Child and two angels with crown". On either side were angels, holding a shield, the other a armillary sphere. Another panel, far smaller, was represented the patron saint São Pantaleão...On the same, were installed the armory and coffers of the municipal registry...".

Between the 15th and 18th century, the municipal council met in this new building. But, by 1485, the floor with access to Rua de São Sebastião, corresponding to a store, was rented out to the knight Afonso Ferraz. This floor was unoccupied and was not necessary to the function of the municipal council. In its offices was a cage that housed the Blessed Sacrament used during the festival of Corpus Christi.

Leading to 1536, when the building was under risk of ruin, from gashes and breeches in the walls, even as the council continued its presence in the building. On 18 July 1539, an order determined to correct the problems in the building. The Senate requested that Diogo Castilho advise them, who at the time worked on the Monastery of Serra do Pilar and Convent of Monchique. Castilho did not understand that the Senate wanted to demolish the building, and rather defended that the reinforcement of the structure, estimating that the work would require 30,000 to 40,000 réis.

On 4 February 1604, the municipal council took charge of the floor rented by Afonso Ferraz. In July, a painting by Baltasar Gonçalves was publicly sold by Inácio Ferraz de Figueiroa was publicly sold. Between October and November, a new panel was complete for the Hall of Audiences, painted by Inácio Ferraz de Figueiroa. A similar work was painted in the retable for the assembly hall, by Figueiroa on 1 August 1607.

There is a reference to the Conserto em algumas janelas da Casa da Câmara (referring to the repair of windows in the House) in 1766, as well as the 1767, repairs to the roofing. In 1770, master Manuel Pinto Geraldo began repairs to the roof, starting a period of minor repairs. José Luís de Oliveira, repaired the glazed windows in 1774. In successive years there were attempts to rectify the problems of the tower: in 1783, master mason, Caetano Pereira and in 1788, master mason, Bartolomeu de Carvalho.

In 1784, an inspection of the house/tower resulted in the suggestion by the prelates that the structure should be demolished. As part of the transition, before its destruction, on 1 March an accord was signed between directors and the monks of Grilos, to transfer the Senate to part of the Convent of Grilos. Following their move, it became the seat of the Casa dos Vinte e Quatro (House of the Twenty-Four).

Between 1795 and 1796, the beginning of the demolition of the last floor by master mason António Alves, making it dangerous for the surrounding structures. Much of the stone taken from the structure was reused in the building of the Relação na Cordoaria.

By royal decree, in 1805, the municipal council is authorized to transfer its role from the Colégio de São Lourenço to the building of Casa Pia. The council continued to an itinerant assembly eventually adapting the Palace of Praça Nova das Hortas, at the corner of the Rua do Laranjal, for the municipal installations on 21 August 1818. Meanwhile, the Casa da Câmara was rented, and it suffered a violent fire that left the structure in ruin after 25 April 1875.

At the beginning of the 20th century, the municipal council was authorized to rent the Episcopal Palace of Porto to operate, while work was being performed on the site along Avenida dos Aliados. The council began to use the Palace on 3 February 1916, which it occupied until 1957, when the assembly took-up residence in the current Municipal Palace of Porto. In 1960, the DGEMN proposed the classification of the old Casa da Câmara as National Monument or Property of Public Interest, but the Sociedade Nacional de Belas Artes objected to its classification. During the 1980s, excavations, under the responsibility of Dr. Manuel Real, proving the Gothic construction of the tower led to the demolition of part of the Romanesque wall.

Reconstruction of the tower began in 2000, a project architect Fernando Távora, but which lead to a public outcry by surrounding residents against the intervention and re-construction in November. Távora, he wanted to recreate the House/Tower of the old municipal hall, and hinted at a new construction on concrete and with a surface of granite, along with glass and iron lattice. Functionally, it was projected as a space and memorial for the old city. Regardless, the work was completed in 2002, and the spaces were reopened on 27 September to act as tourism post.

== Architecture ==
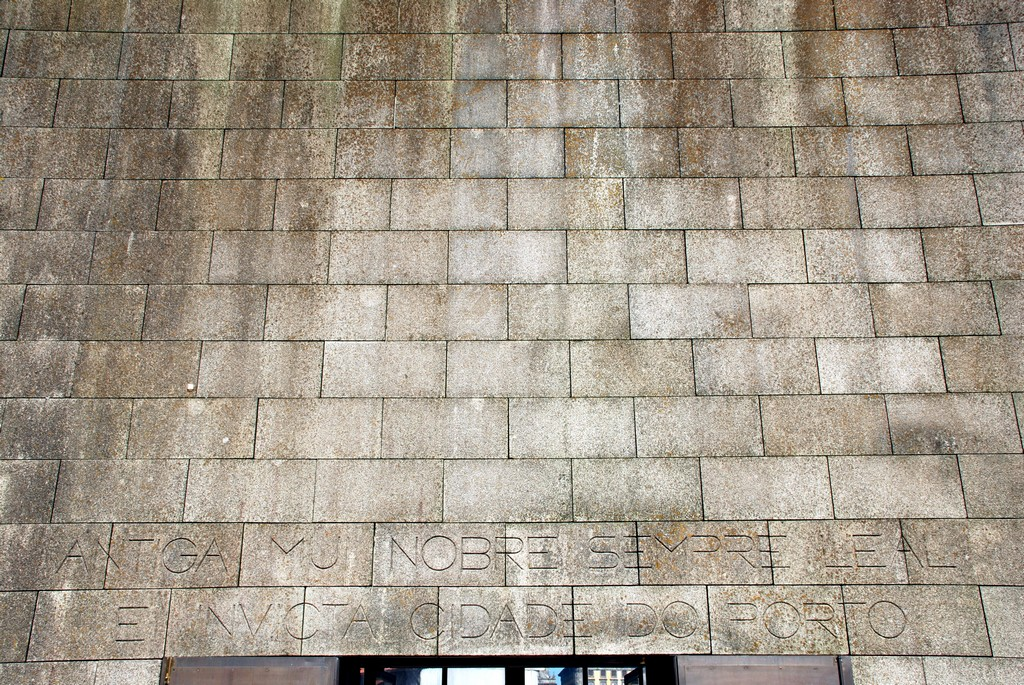
The inner wall of the Casa da Câmara and inscription of the ...Undefeated City of Porto

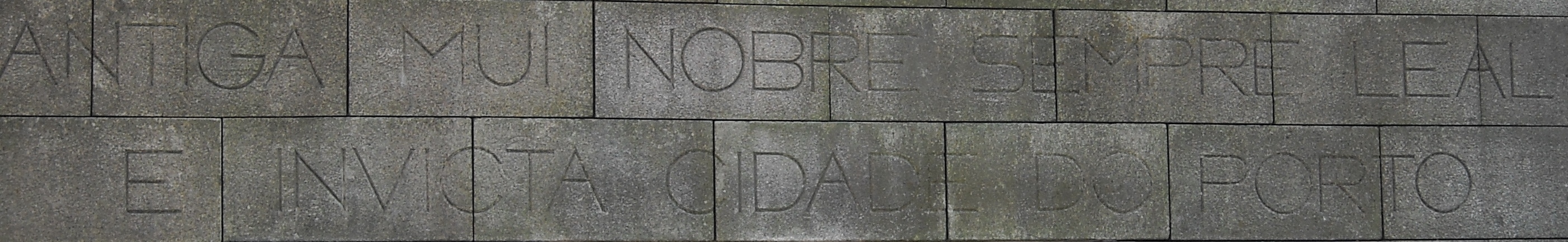
Detail of the inscription

The house is located in an isolated location, with the historic centre and any area of elevated patrimonial value, along the wall of the Sé Cathedral of Porto. The vestiges of the old municipal building, with access to the Rua de São Sebastião, over the Romanesque wall, in a location that was once occupied by the Santo Mártir Gate (Saint Martyred Gate). Near this, on a lower level and with access to the Rua de São Sebastião, is the Chapel of Senhor dos Passos.

The irregular plan consists of the vestiges of the old municipal house, with a rectangular, contemporary tower over its eastern edge. The volume is vertically dominant, covered by a terrace on its top. By the stereotomy of the stonework it is evident that the a framed balcony span had been constructed without taipa (common at the time) with the use of great stones.

The old municipal house was a regular granite structure, with grated doors in the west and north, with a northern elevation accessible by ramp. The western portico is demarcated by its facade and remnants of two vanes, with battlements and projected frame with lateral rectangular grille window. In the interior, its placement created two platforms, with pavements of granite slabs. The openings, relative to the wooden floor support beams, are visible in the interior walls. On the eastern, western and southern walls are the exposed concrete walls of the tower. Inside the ruin lies the statue of O Porto, resting on a granite pedestal, facing the back of the tower, and exposed to the city.

The tower's lateral facades is covered with masonry, simulating regular granite, with the upper third of the main and posterior facades in glass and ironworks. The main facada, facing the east, is marked on its base by a rectangular, slightly-recessed curtain with a central door. Above the wall is an inscription:

ANTIGA MUI NOBRE SEMPRE LEAL E INVICTA CIDADE DO PORTO
Old Very Nobl Always Loyal and Undefeated City of Porto

The upper third, has an iron-and-glass structure of iron and glass, slightly retracted from the rest of the facade. The lateral facades face the north and south, respectively, and are identical, raised above the roof. On the north face is the coat-of-arms of the town of Porto, with vestiges of the silhares of the primitive wall (where it was integrated). The rear facade is an extension of the lateral facades, with a structure of glass and iron set back.

The interior is structured into three floors with internal stairs.
