= Car boot liner =

Mat to protect inside of vehicle

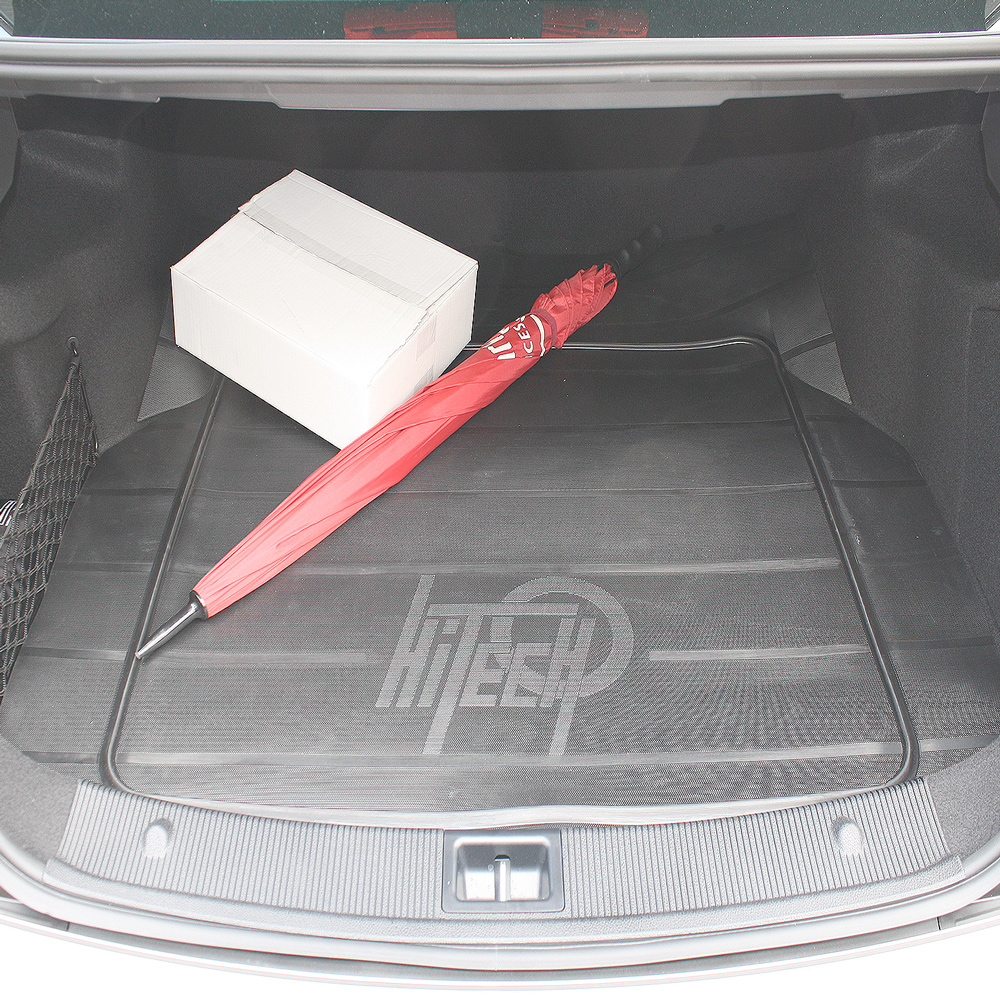
Rubber boot liner

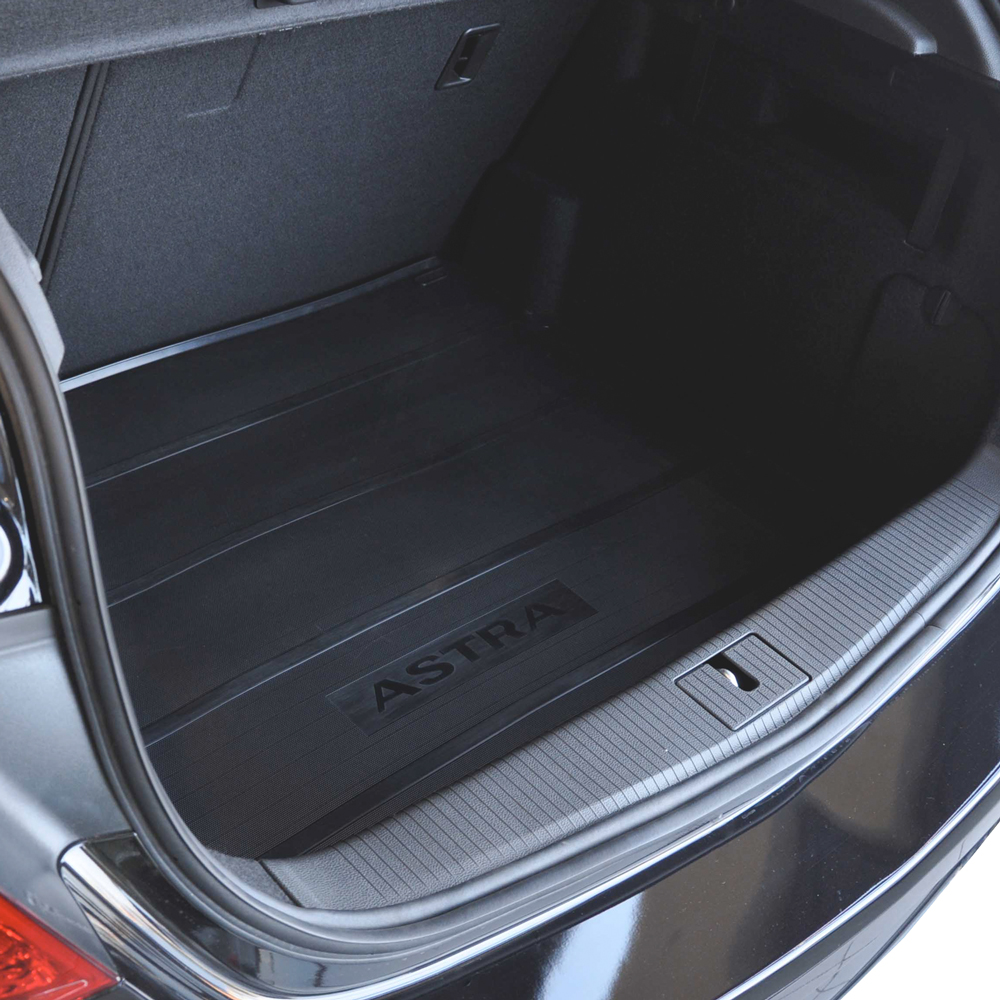
Vauxhall Astra Boot liner

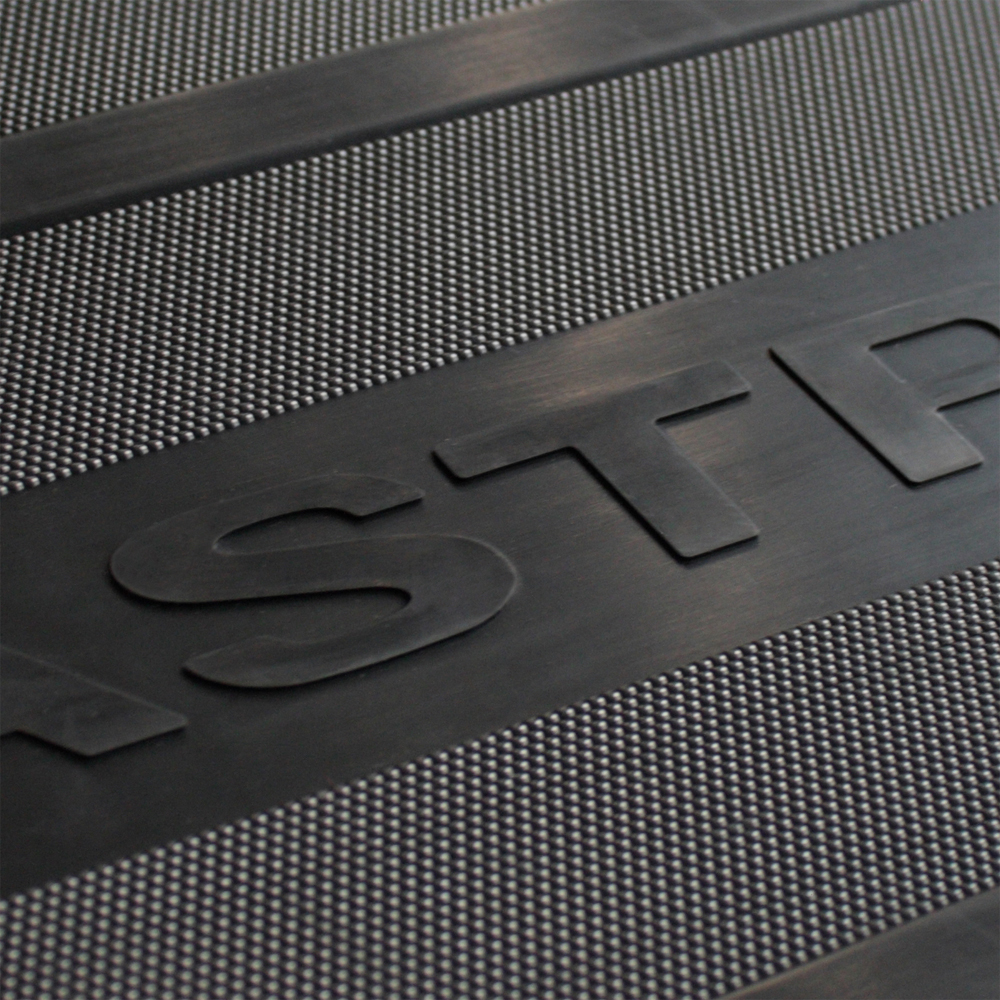
Detailed shot of a boot liner

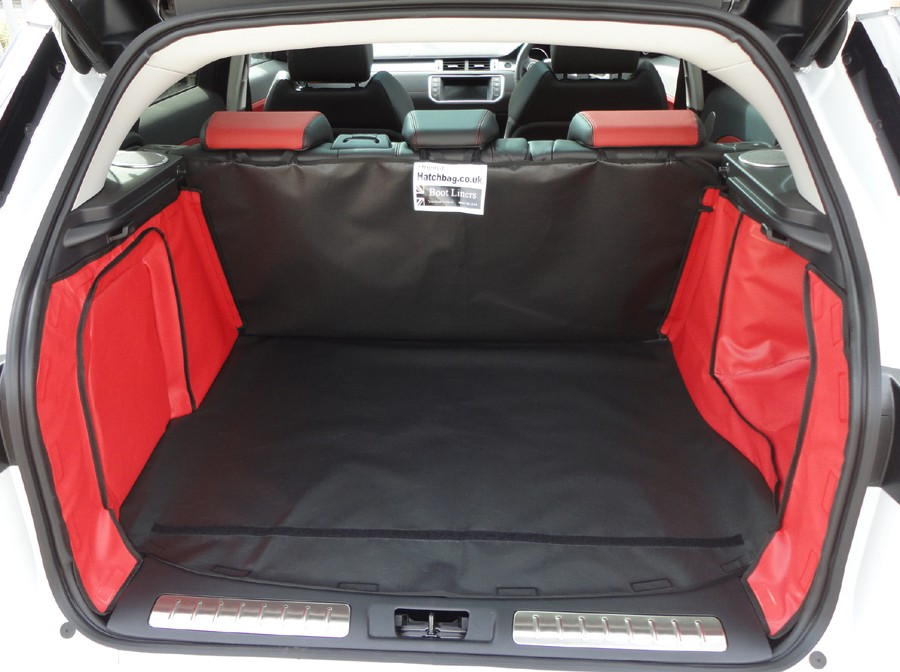
A tailored car boot liner for the Range Rover Evoque, designed and manufactured by The Hatchbag Company

A car boot liner or cargo liner is a synthetic mat designed to protect the automobile boot or trunk against damage from dirt or spills and to pad cargo against abrasion or shock. Specifically, a boot liner shields the vehicle carpet from damage. Boot liners are usually removable, so they may be cleaned or replaced.

== Types ==
The standard PVC boot liner is universal in nature and then trimmed to fit by the end user. It is ideally developed for simple shaping and is flat in nature and consequently offers less protective qualities.

Alternatively, there are boot liners made from rubber that are tailored / "custom-made" to fit the flat space of a vehicle's specific cargo area. Typically, these mats have a channeled, repeated upper design and raised edges. The top surface design is usually non-slip in nature and helps to prevent spills, liquid leakages, or other damages from occurring in the internal cargo space.

Both universal and "custom" boot liners can be rolled up and removed or replaced if necessary.

Thermoplastic elastomer (TPE) is a form of thermoplastic, a rubber-like material commonly used in boot liners. It is favored by OEM and Aftermarket manufacturers because of its speed of production (vacuum formed), light weight, and strength. This material type is rigid enough to withstand and protect heavy cargo loads while preserving the vehicle's interior. An additional benefit of TPE is its ability to maintain its engineered shape while being removed or maneuvered, keeping dirt and spills from falling off the mat.

There are also highly tailored boot liners available, often made from PVC or Cloth. These liners offer protection for the boot area (floor, sides and back of seats) and are often available in several configurations and colors as specified by the customer. These liners are usually specifically designed for individual car models.

Those wanting to protect all of the interior of the boot (floor, sides and back of seats including the roof lining and bumper bar) can use a heavy-duty polyester boot liner. These are designed to be fitted when needed, and stored under the seat or in the spare tire area when not. This type of liner can withstand heavy domestic use and are water-resistant (not waterproof). They are not tailored to a specific vehicle and are available in small and large sizes to suit most hatches, wagons, SUVs and 4WD vehicles.

Some boot liners are designed to overlap over the bumper edge to prevent damage during loading. This has also been developed by car manufacturers to offer all-around protection.

== Materials ==
Boot liners are commonly made from several different types of synthetic or natural rubber.

- Natural rubber
- Styrene-butadiene
- Thermoplastic elastomer
- Low-density polyethylene
- Polyester

== Patent ==
A patent for a "motor vehicle boot insert" was approved in 1993.

A patent for an "Abstract Receptacle for vehicles" was granted in 2012.

== See also ==
- Vehicle mat
- Mat
