= House of the Twenty-Four =

Building in Portugal

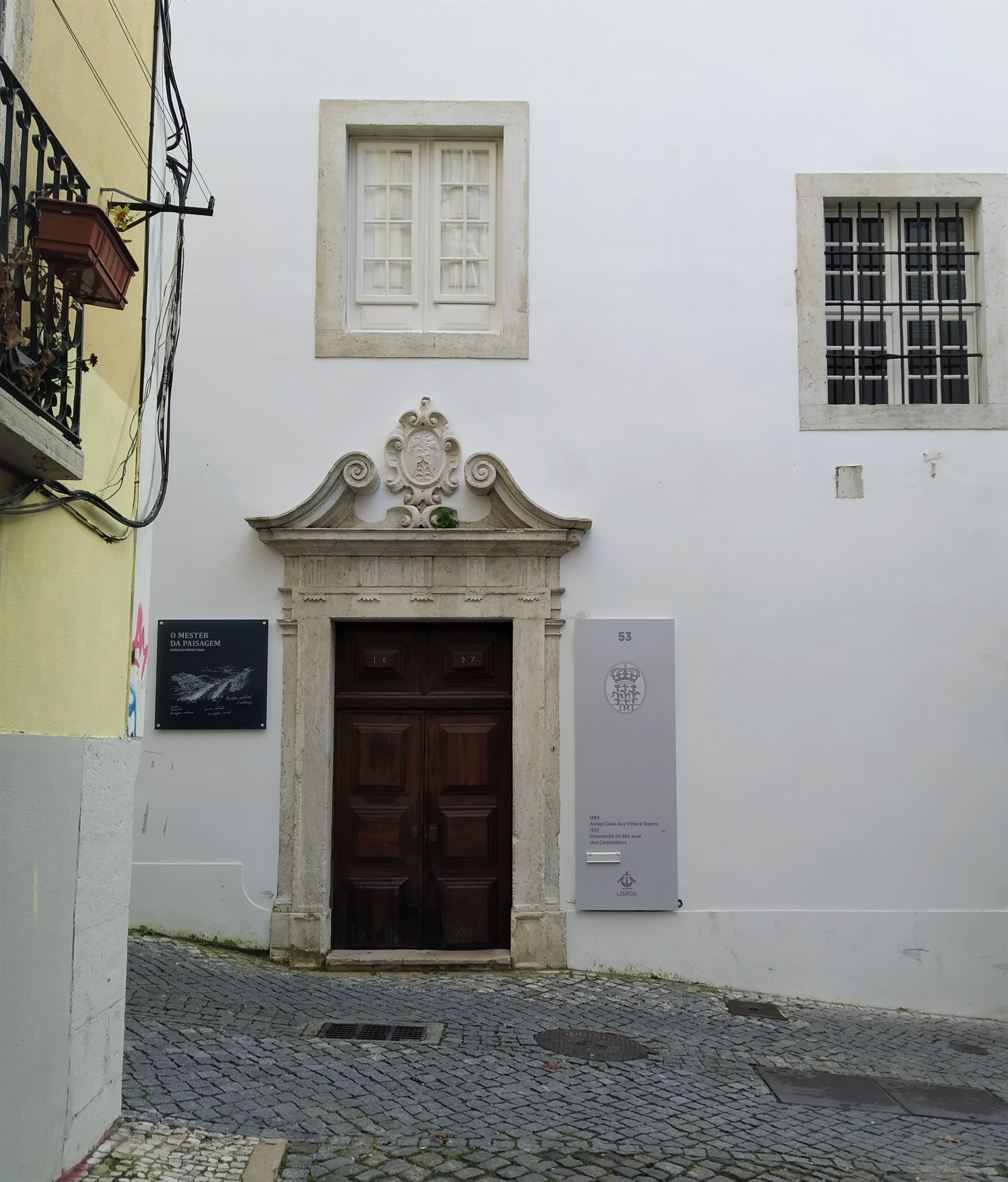
The old House of the Twenty-Four, next to the Church of Saint Joseph of the Carpenters (São José dos Carpinteiros), Lisbon, its seat following the 1755 Lisbon earthquake

The House of the Twenty-Four (Portuguese: Casa dos Vinte e Quatro [ˈkazɐ ðuʒ ˈvĩtɨ i ˈkwatɾu]) was a corporation in the pre-Constitutional Kingdom of Portugal that functioned as a deliberative assembly of craftsmen, with significant political power in local government.

All the artisans and craftsmen in Lisbon were traditionally organised into twelve trade guilds; each guild, comprising several different trades, selected their patron saint and gathered under their own banner (for this reason, guilds were popularly known as bandeiras, banners). Each guild annually elected two representatives, good-men (homens-bons) to sit at the House of the Twenty-Four; these, in turn, elected from among themselves four Procurators who sat in the Municipal Council, and whose vote was required in any deliberation which affected the crafts in particular and the Third Estate generally.

The first House of the Twenty-Four, in Lisbon, was established in 1383 by John, Master of Aviz. Similar corporations were established in other cities and towns in the country and elsewhere in the Portuguese Empire. Houses of the Twenty-Four were created in Coimbra and in Évora in 1459; in Funchal in 1483; in Porto in 1518; in Angra, probably in 1578; in Braga in c. 1647. In settlements that were not major urban centres they tended to be instead a House of the Twelve (Portuguese: Casa dos Doze); such a House was created in 1535 in Guimarães. Notably, these were nonexistent in Portuguese Africa and almost absent in Portuguese America (Salvador was the only city in Brazil to have a similar institution, in the 17th century), since the creation of guilds there was timid due to the widespread use of slave labour. In Portuguese India, these corporations existed in at least Goa and Cochin.

Created during the 1383–1385 interregnum, the Houses of the Twenty-Four were dissolved in 1834 by the Regent Duke of Braganza, as the institution was deemed incompatible with the Constitutional Charter of 1826.

== History ==
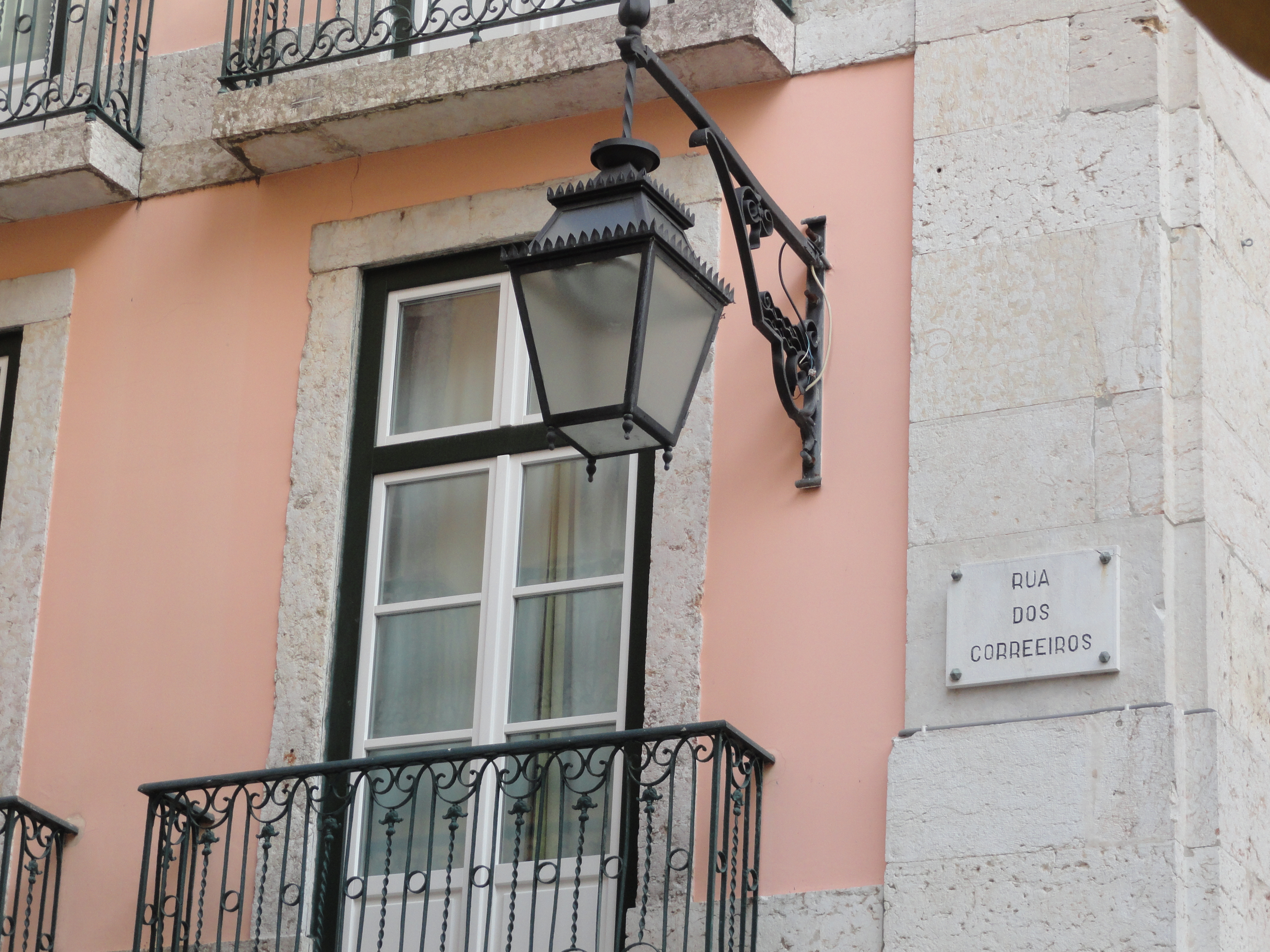
The toponymics of the Pombaline Downtown in Lisbon still references the fact that guildsmen were often grouped together on a single street so the quantity and quality of their products could be better regulated and dues could be more easily collected. Here pictured, the Rua dos Correeiros (Leathercrafters' Street).

The first of its kind, the House of the Twenty-Four of Lisbon was established in 1383 by John, Master of Aviz, in recognition of the city's populace after their loyal support of his regency in its struggle with the nobility during the 1383–1385 interregnum. The masters of the various "mechanical" professions were accorded representation on the Municipal Council, hitherto reserved to rural property owners, the minor nobility, and the wealthier members of the bourgeoisie. Before that date, craftsmen (mesteirais) were sometimes summoned to municipal assemblies (such as in 1285, 1298, 1304, 1333, 1336, 1352, 1355, and 1364), but their political participation seemingly did not have significant weight and was even restricted by King Denis in 1298 because their opposing input slowed down the process.

Proportional representation in the House of the Twenty-Four was reached by periodic elections, held every year on 21 December (Feast of Saint Thomas the Apostle) in a building in Rossio, next to All Saints' Royal Hospital. This served to ensure the expanding professions gained greater influence and that those in decline were not over-represented after their importance in the economy had waned. Representatives to the House of the Twenty-Four had to fill a number of criteria, among them being a natural born Portuguese subject of good standing, literate, older than forty years of age, and married (with the exception of those sheltering widowed mothers, sisters, or other female relatives).

The 17th century has been called the "golden age" of the House of the Twenty-Four, as individual corporations sought and received favourable additions to their regimentos, increasing their status and privileges. In 1620, the chief official of the House of the Twenty-Four was granted the title of Tribune of the People (juiz do povo). The position of Tribune of the People became one of great prestige, almost having the role of chief spokesman for the popular causes, since the Twenty-Four did not only exert their influence on municipal government in their own behalf, but were also the sole political representatives through whom the interests of the commoners could ordinarily be brought before the Council and the King.

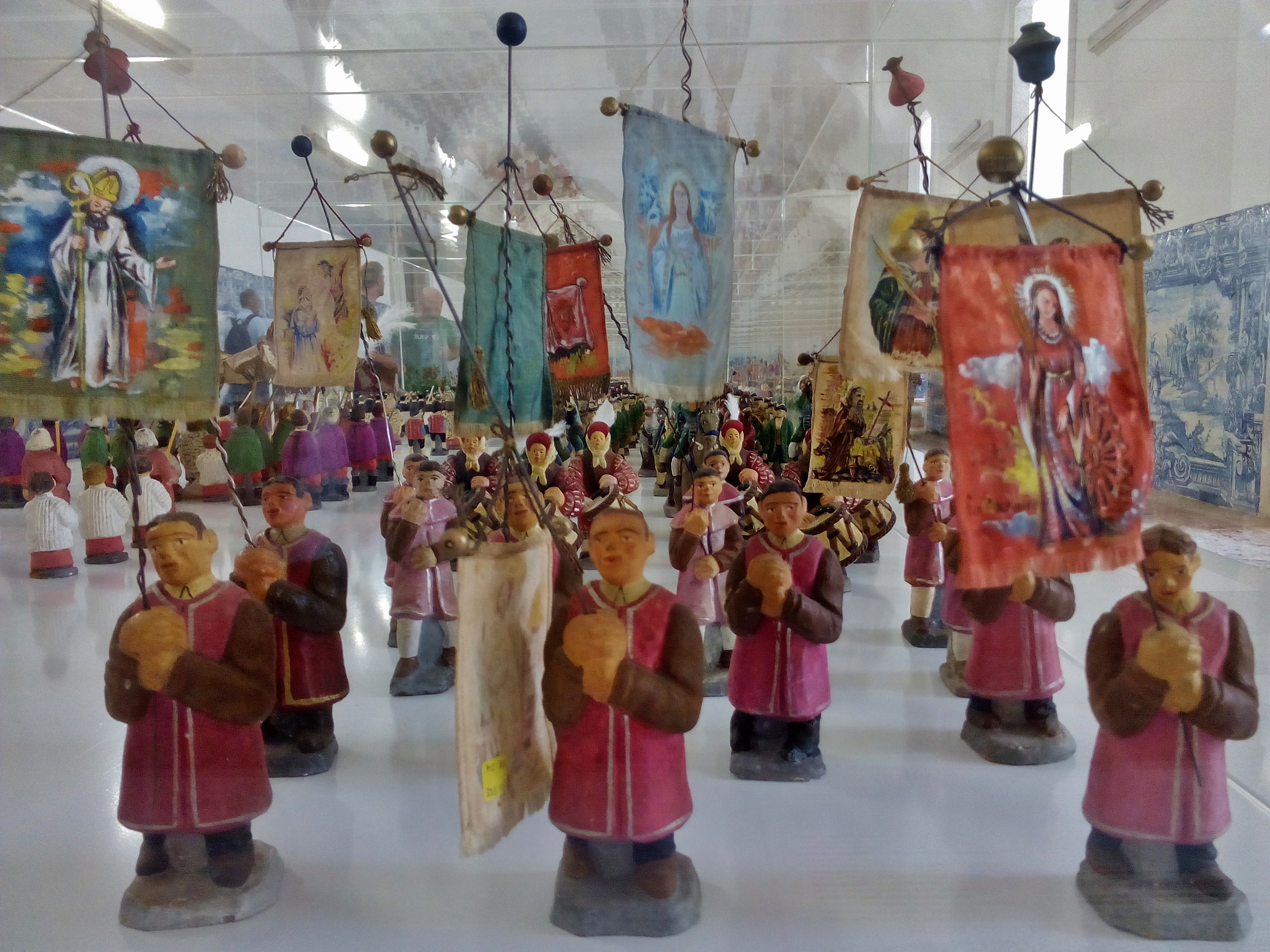
A depiction of the members of the House of the Twenty-Four under their respective banners during the important procession of Corpus Christi (ceramic figurines by Diamantino Tojal in the collection of the Museum of Lisbon)

Even though the guilds enjoyed royal protection, the relationship between the Crown and the corporation was not always amicable. Two notable examples are the disestablishment of the House of the Twenty-Four of Lisbon by King Manuel I in 1506, as punishment for the disruption of public order that resulted in the Easter Slaughter (the House was only reestablished by King John III in 1508, after substantial reform), and the disestablishment of the House of the Twenty-Four of Porto in 1661, when it was accused of taking part in the riots against the tax on stamped paper created by Luisa de Guzmán, Queen Regent (it was restored in 1668), and again in 1757, after opposition to the General Company of Agriculture of the Wines of the Upper Douro (it was restored in 1795).

== Organisation ==
The different guilds of Lisbon comprised many different trades that gathered under a common patron saint in what were essentially devotional brotherhoods. Each of the guilds took part in the procession of the Feast of Corpus Christi, a very important moment in Lisbon's religious, social, and political life.

Each of the guilds gathered under their own ornate processional banner during the procession (for this reason, the guilds were also popularly known as bandeiras, banners), which were richly woven in damask, brocade and goldwork, with depictions of their patron saints. Each guild or trade took a precise position in the procession, denoting precedence; this was frequently the source of contention, such as when the goldsmiths of Lisbon began a squabble over their position: the heated debate started in 1657 and was still unresolved in 1717.

The example below is the composition of the Nova Regulação da Casa dos Vinte e Quatro de Lisboa ("New Regulation of the House of the Twenty-Four of Lisbon"), Alvará of 3 December 1771:

Banner (Bandeira)		Head	Annexed
1	Saint George	Barbers (barbeiros de barbear) and sword cutlers (barbeiros de guarnecer espadas)	Farriers (ferradores), goldbeaters (bate-folhas), blacksmiths (ferreiros), coppersmiths (fundidores de cobre), gilders (douradores), locksmiths (serralheiros), cutlers (cutileiros), and gunsmiths (espingardeiros)
2	Saint Michael	Booksellers (livreiros), silk weavers (serigueiros de agulha), glovers (luveiros), hatband makers (serigueiros de chapéus), bead makers (conteiros), comb makers (pentieiros), ribbon and galloon makers (fabricantes de fitas e galões), and brass-founders (latoeiros de fundição)	
3	Saint Crispin	Cordwainers (sapateiros), and tanners (curtidores)	Curriers (surradores), and wineskin makers (odreiros)
4	Our Lady of the Immaculate Conception	Leathercrafters (correeiros)	Saddlers (seleiros), and bridle makers (freeiros)
5	Our Lady of Mercy (Note: In 1539, it was instead the Banner of Saint Anne.)	Pastry cooks (pasteleiros), whitesmiths (latoeiros de folha branca), tinkers (latoeiros de folha amarela), and turners (torneiros)	
6	Saint Joseph	Masons (pedreiros), and carpenters (carpinteiros de casas)	Stonecutters (canteiros), brick-makers (ladrilheiros), and luthiers (violeiros)
7	Saint Gundisalvus	Shearers (tosadores), dyers (tintureiros), weavers (tecelões), and mat makers (esteireiros)	
8	Our Lady of the Olive Tree	Confectioners (confeiteiros)	Coach makers (carpinteiros de carruagens), and tinsmiths (picheleiros)
9	Our Lady of the Candles	Tailors (alfaiates)	Fripperers (algibebes), and scabbard makers (bainheiros)
10	Our Lady of the Incarnation	Cabinetmakers (carpinteiros de móveis), wood carvers (entalhadores), and gunstock makers (coronheiros)	
Electors not integrated in a guild (ofícios não embandeirados) (Note: In 1786, the potters (oleiros) and the chocolatiers (chocolateiros) formed the Banner of Saints Justa and Rufina, the 11th Bandeira.)		Coopers (tanoeiros), and chandlers (cirieiros)	
Electors not integrated in a guild (ofícios não embandeirados)		Goldsmiths (ourives de ouro), and lapidarists (lapidários)	
Electors not integrated in a guild (ofícios não embandeirados)		Silversmiths (ourives de prata), and chasers (lavrantes)	
Electors not integrated in a guild (ofícios não embandeirados)		Potters (oleiros), and milliners (sombreireiros)	
Electors not integrated in a guild (ofícios não embandeirados)		Flax twinemakers (cordoeiros de linho), and piassava and esparto cordmakers (cordoeiros de esparto e piaçá)	
Electors not integrated in a guild (ofícios não embandeirados)		Esparto weavers (esparteiros)	
