= Tule shoe =

The tule shoe is a mat of woven reeds wired to a horse shoe. The oversized shoes were invented by Chinese laborers in 1850s California to help build levees and reclaim land in the Sacramento Delta.

== See also ==
- Chinese immigration to the United States
- Land reclamation
- Levee
