= Vehicle mat =

Floor protection in a motor vehicle

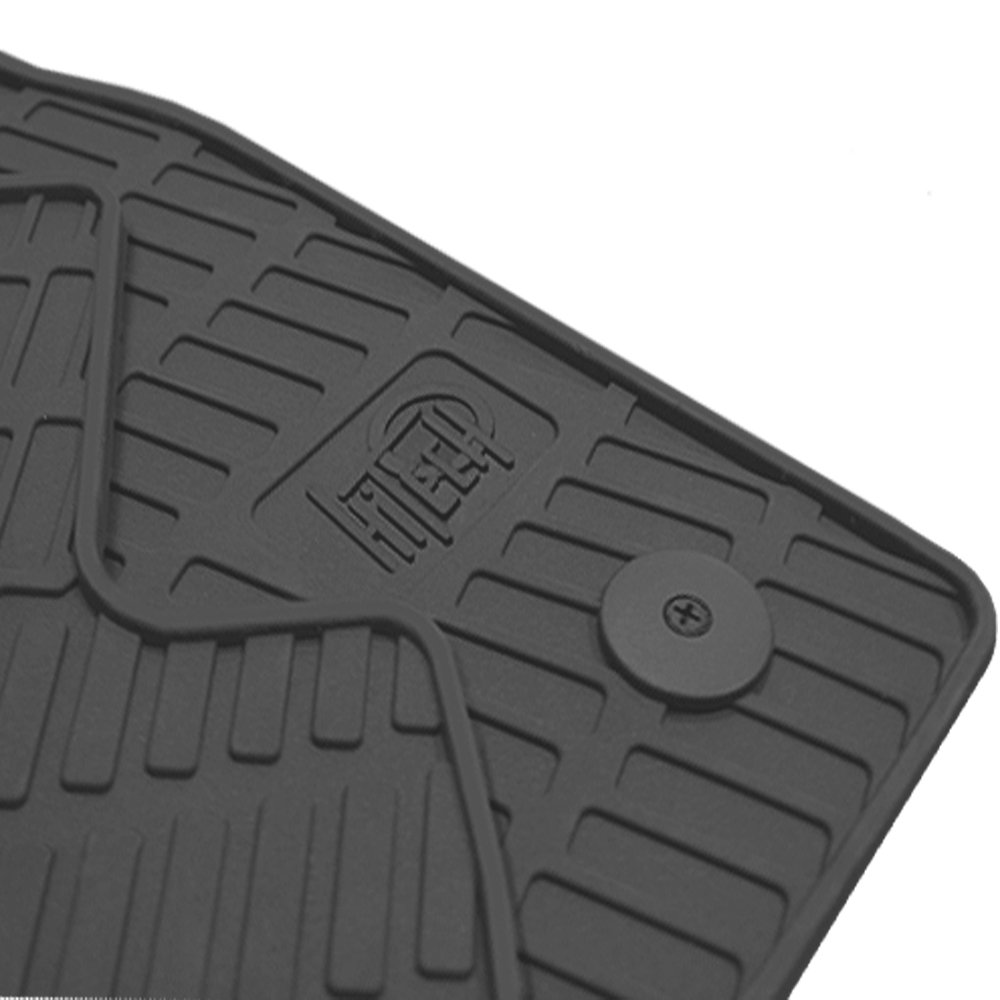
Tailored rubber mat

Vehicle mats, also known as "automobile floor mats", are designed to protect a vehicle's floor from dirt, wear, and salt corrosion.

One major use of a vehicle mat is to keep the car looking clean. Most mats can be easily removed for cleaning and then replaced. Some require fixation points to ensure they remain fixed in position. Mats are generally considered unnecessary in vehicles which are permanently fitted with rubber carpets - such as commercial vehicles (trucks, vans) and some off road and agricultural vehicles.

== Overview ==
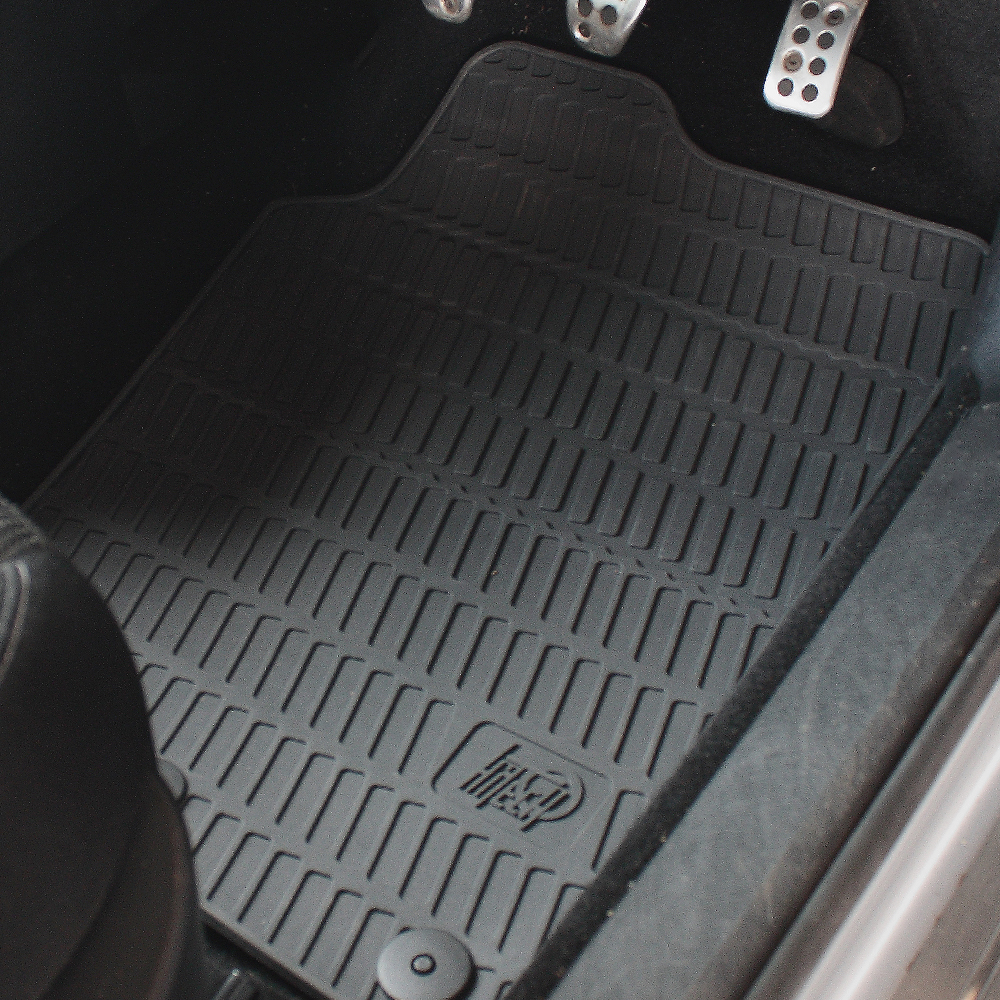
Fitted rubber car mat

Vehicle mats are an interior car parts accessory that dealerships generally include with the purchase of a vehicle. However, with the surge in leasing organizations and sales through such channels, some cars are offered without them.

Vehicle floor mats come in a variety of shapes and materials. They may feature spikes, grooves, or caps to capture dirt and water, and be made from the synthetic rubber (often referred to as "vinyl" or "thermoplastic") or textile materials.

== Materials ==
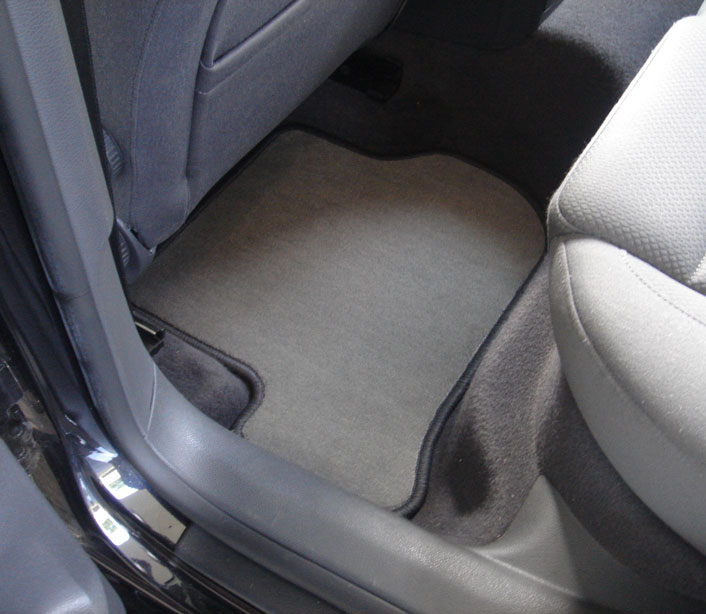
Fitted carpet car mat.

Vehicle mats generally come in two options: either rubber or carpet fabric. These differ in a number of ways, and each material provides advantages and disadvantages when compared to the other. For instance, carpet mats are generally tufted and have a rubberized anti-slip backing, while rubber mats are heavier-duty and more durable.

Also, some car mats are the plain color of rubber, while many others contain branded company logos, cartoon characters, or advertisements. They can also come in a wide range of colors.

The terms "universal" and "custom fit" differentiate between floor mats that will fit a multitude of different cars versus those that are specifically designed to fit only one chassis.

Some styles of mats may feature small, flexible spikes on their underside to grip carpeting underneath. A more common method of retention, though, is a fitting system that hooks, clips, or twists into an anchor point already positioned on the vehicle floor. This anchor is typically pre-installed by the OEM but some aftermarket manufacturers of "custom fit" mats also provide this.

== Regulations ==
Car mats produced by original equipment manufacturers must follow stringent regulations in the US, especially due to recent recalls of Toyota car mats that posed safety hazards. Factors that are regulated include odor release, durability, performance in various heat levels, etc.

Safety systems are also increasingly common in rubber mats; for example, an anti-slip bottom side and a heel pad for added safety and wear.

== Market changes ==
Original equipment manufacturers are now starting to develop non-OEM channels to offer reduced cost vehicle mats and to expand their markets. Custom manufacturers are now coming to the forefront of the vehicle mat industry.

== Recalls ==
On September 26, 2007, Toyota recalled 55,000 sets of heavy-duty rubber floor mats for the Toyota Camry and Lexus ES 350 sedans. The recalled mats were of the optional "all-weather" type. The NHTSA stated that the recall was due to the risk that unsecured mats could move forward and trap the gas pedal.

On August 28, 2009, a two-car collision killed four people riding in a Lexus dealer-provided loaner ES 350 in San Diego, California; the accident was caused by the Lexus' incorrectly having been fitted with all-weather rubber floor mats meant for the RX 400h SUV, and the fact that these mats were not secured by either of the two retaining clips. Additionally, the brake hardware showed signs of heavy braking consistent with a stuck accelerator pedal. The investigators' report stated that the accelerator pedal's hinge did not allow relieving of obstructions, and the dashboard lacked directions for the three-second emergency press of the push button keyless ignition. NHTSA investigators also recovered the accident vehicle's accelerator pedal, which was still "bonded" to the SUV floor mat.

== See also ==
- 2009–2011 Toyota vehicle recalls
- Car boot liner
- Mat
- Rubber mat
- n:Toyota accused of misleading public over recalls
