= Trunk (car) =

Part of automobile

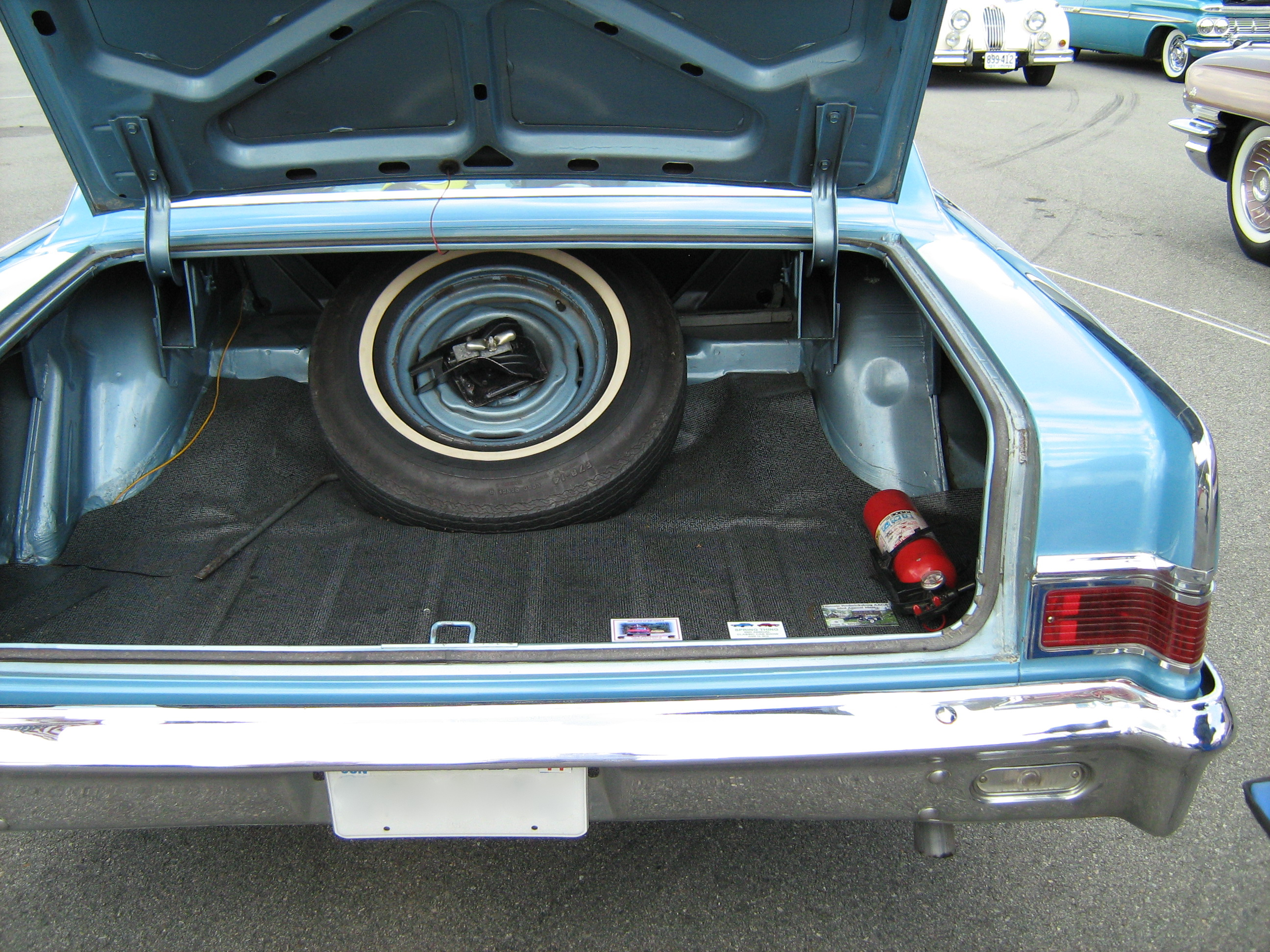
The trunk of a front-engined car will often contain a spare tire

The trunk (American English) or boot (British English) of a car is the vehicle's main storage or cargo compartment, often a hatch at the rear of the vehicle. It can also be called a tailgate.

In Indian English, the storage area is known as a dickey (also spelled dicky, dickie, or diggy). In Southeast Asia, it is known as a compartment.

== Designs ==
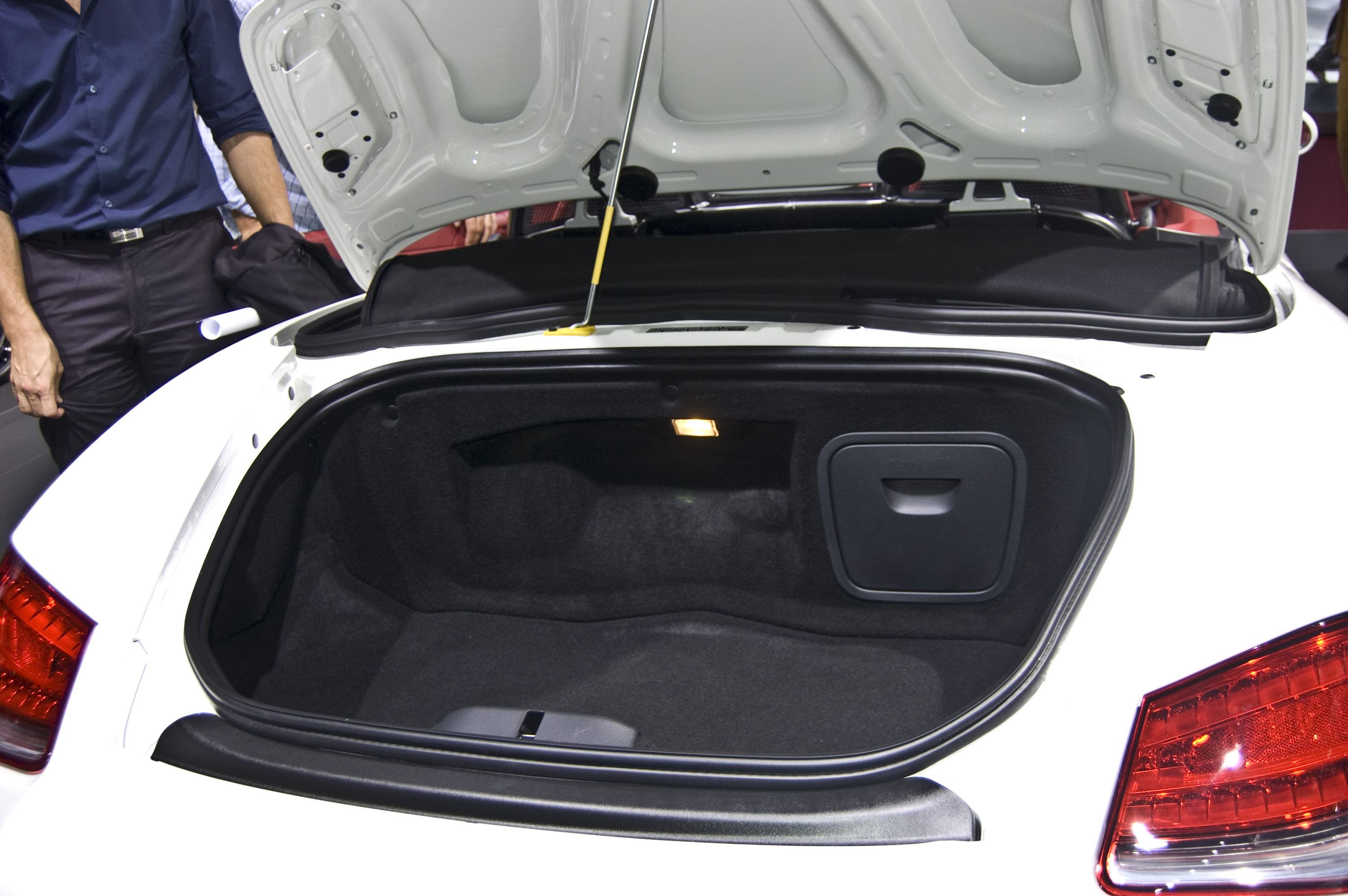
The trunk of a mid-engined Porsche Boxster

The trunk or luggage compartment is most often at the rear of the vehicle. Early designs had an exterior rack on the rear of the vehicle to attach a luggage trunk. Later designs integrated the storage area into the vehicle's body, and eventually became more streamlined. The main storage compartment is normally provided at the end of the vehicle opposite to which the engine is located (the "engine bay" or "engine compartment").

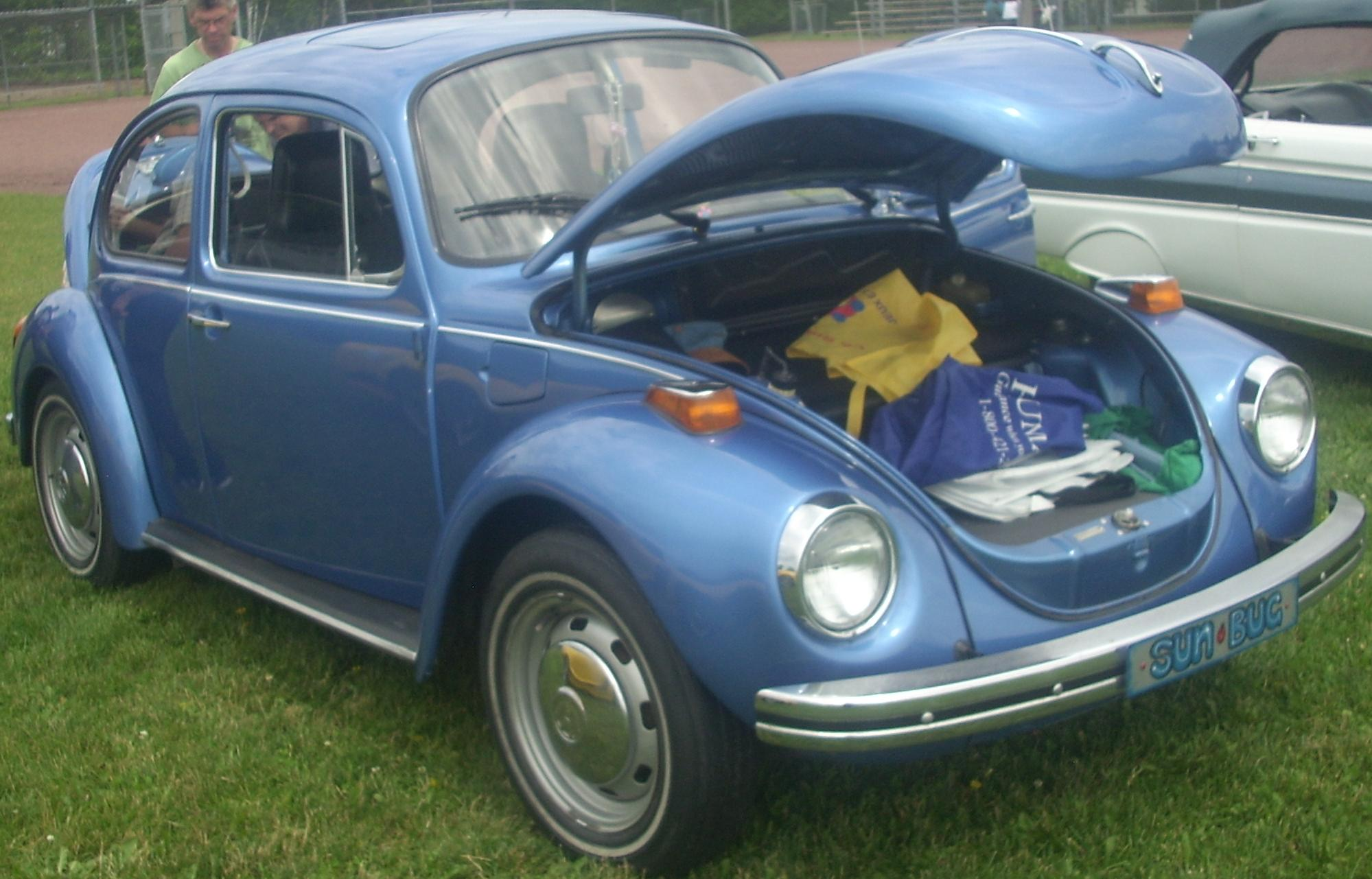
The trunk of a rear-engined Volkswagen Beetle, which stowed its spare tire

Some vehicles have the trunk in front of the passenger compartment, e.g. rear-engined cars like Volkswagen Beetle and Porsche 911, or electric vehicles like Ford F-150 Lightning. This is occasionally known as a frunk, a portmanteau of the words "front" and "trunk". The alternative term froot (a combination of "front" and "boot") is also occasionally used.

There are also vehicles with both front and rear trunks, either with low profile rear drivetrains, e.g. Volkswagen Type 3 or Tesla Model S, or with a mid-engine, e.g. Porsche 914 and Boxster, Toyota MR2 and Fiat X1/9.

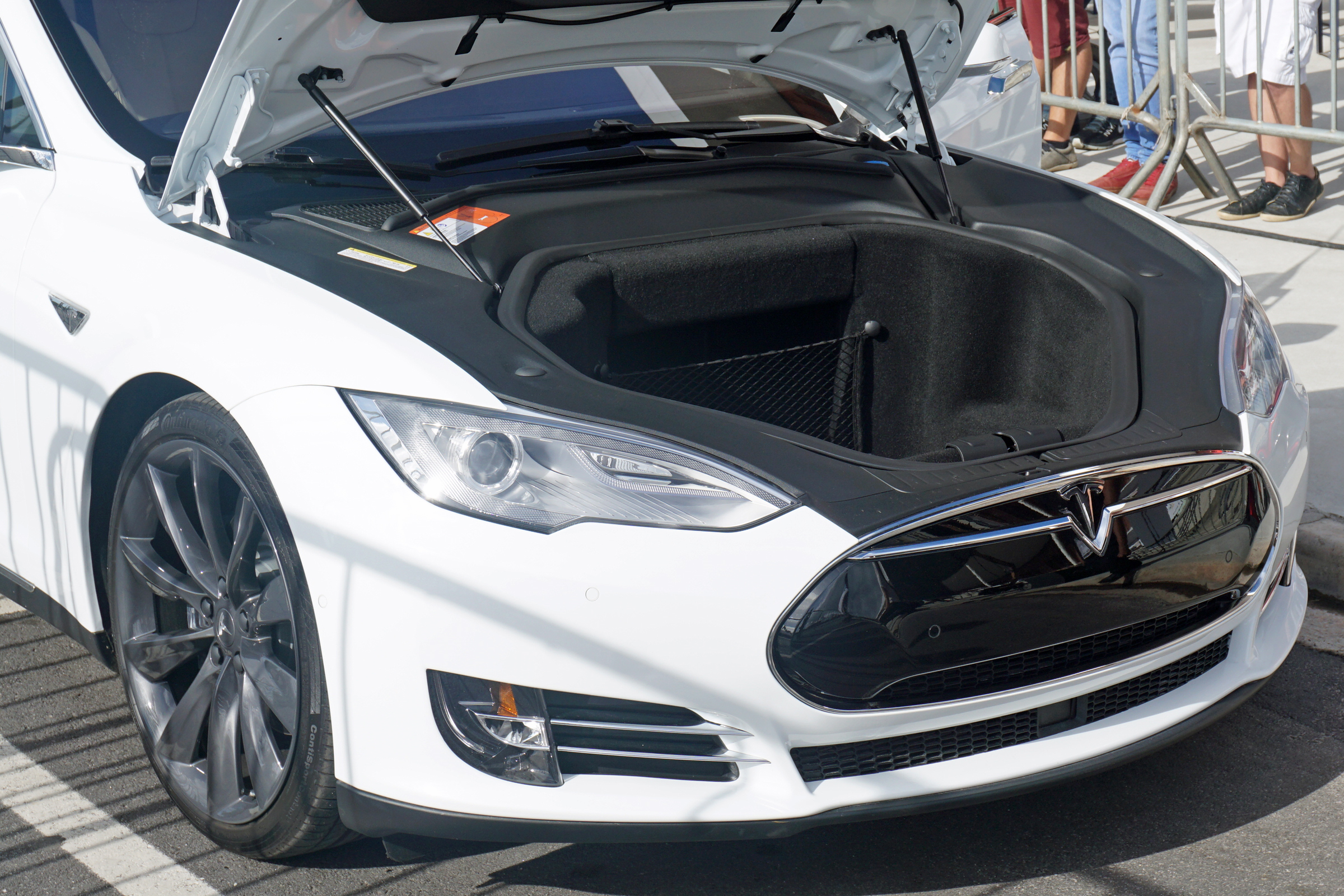
The trunk of an electric-powered Tesla Model S

Sometimes during the design life of the vehicle, the lid may be restyled to increase the size or improve the practicality and usefulness of the trunk's shape. Examples of this include the Beetle redesign to the 1970s 'Super Beetle' and the pre-war and 1950s post war Citroën Traction Avant.

== Openings ==
=== Door ===
The door or opening of a cargo area may be hinged at the top, side, or bottom.

Standard motor vehicle passenger doors are hinged on the side for ease of construction and access. A gull-wing door is a passenger door on the side of a vehicle hinged at the top. Rear-access "tailgates" - for both passengers and cargo - may be found side-opening, bottom-opening, or a combination of both. Top-opening rear passenger and cargo doors are commonly referred to as "hatches".

==== Tailgate ====
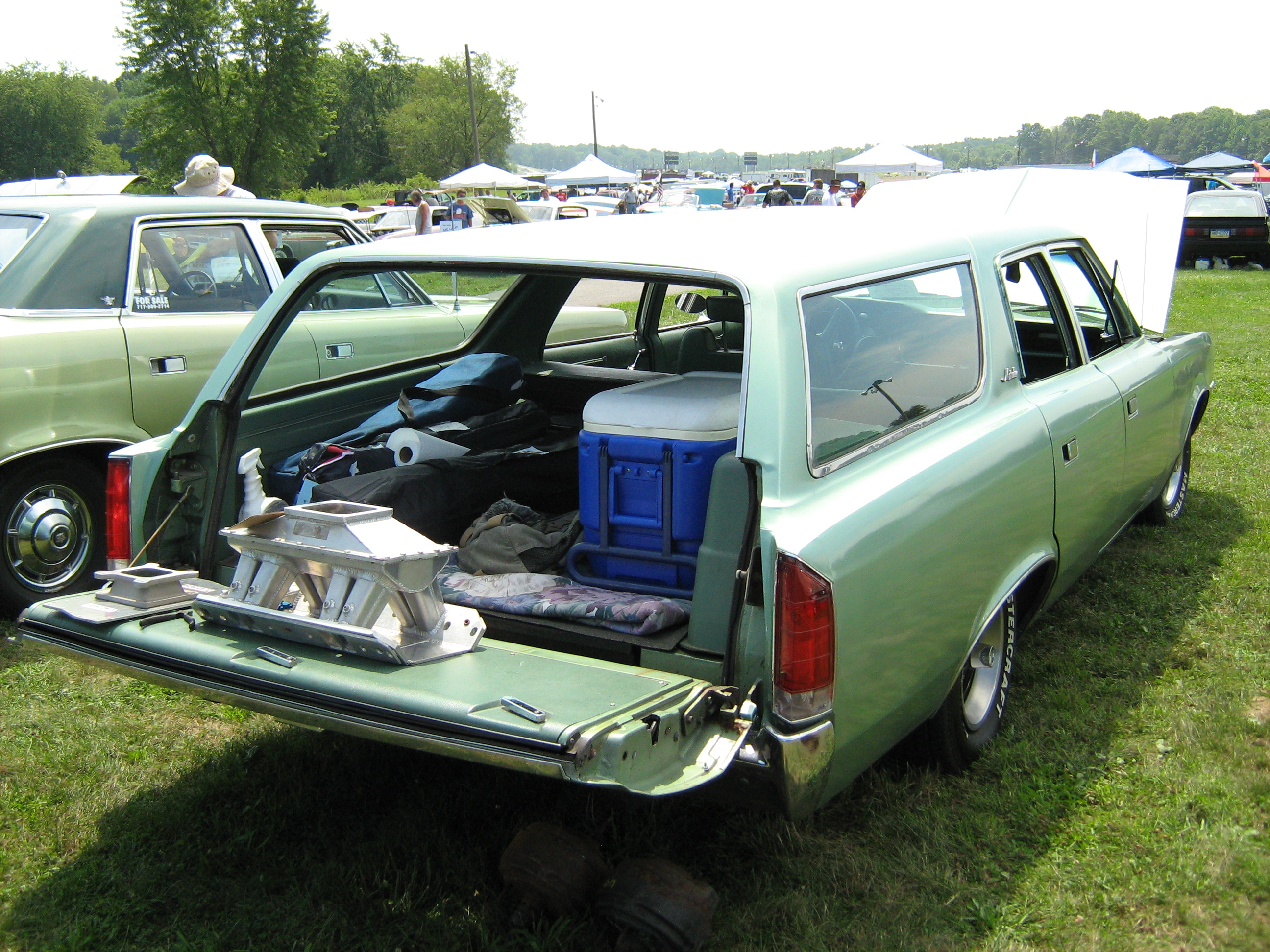
Two-way station wagon tailgate, hinged to open downward or sideways

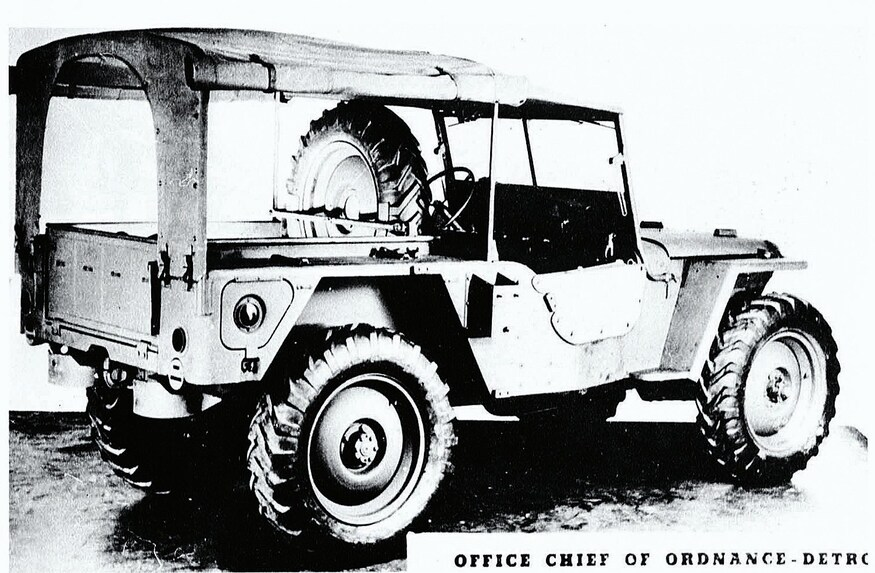
Willys MLW-2 "jeep" prototype added a tailgate to the basic "tub" body design

A door hinged at the bottom providing access to a rear passenger or cargo area is called a tailgate, particularly in the United States. They are used on station wagons and pickup trucks, as well as on some sport utility vehicles (SUV). Traditional drop-down station wagon and pickup tailgates can also serve as a mount for a workbench.

Traditional U.S. station wagons included a roll-down window retracting into the tailgate to load small items or to allow the tailgate to be opened down on its bottom-mounted hinges. Because of the potential for carbon-monoxide fumes, the tailgate window on station wagons should be closed whenever the engine is running.

Two-way station wagon tailgates may be hinged at the side and the bottom so they can be opened sideways like a regular door, or drop downwards as load platform extenders. They are designed with special handle(s) for opening in the selected direction on special hinges after the window is lowered.

A three-way design that was also used by Ford allows for the tailgate to be opened like a door with the window up.

General Motors developed a "clam shell" style "disappearing" design where the rear window rolls up into the roof and the tailgate slides down and beneath the load floor.

==== Hatch ====
A door hinged at the top is termed a hatch. These are found on many modern station wagons, SUVs, and a specific model of car known as a hatchback.

=== Lid ===
The trunk lid (in the U.S. automotive industry sometimes also called decklid or deck lid) is the cover that allows access to the main storage or luggage compartment. Hinges allow the lid to be raised. Devices such as a manually positioned prop rod can keep the panel up in the open position. Counterbalancing torsion or other spring(s) can also be used to help elevate and hold open the trunk lid. On cars with their trunk in the rear, lids sometimes incorporate a center-mounted third brake light. A rear lid may also have an integral air spoiler. On many modern cars, the trunk lids can be unlocked with the car's key fob.

=== Design history ===
- In 1950, Ford introduced a trigger catch to allow for one-handed lifting until the trunk lid was automatically caught in the open position.
- In 1952, Buick marketed its counterbalanced trunk lid that "practically raises itself" and the automatic locking mechanism.
- In 1956, the Packard "Predictor" show car designed by Dick Teague debuted at the Chicago Auto Show featuring innovations such as a power operated trunk lid.
- In 1958, the remote activated electric trunk release was introduced by U.S. automakers in production vehicles.
- The 1965 AMC Cavalier concept car featured a trunk lid with dual-action, scissor-type hinges allowing the panel to be opened like a normal trunk lid, or to be horizontally elevated even to the height of the car's roof line for greater utility when hauling large and bulky items. Both the hood and trunk lid were made from identical stampings and interchangeable.

=== Locks ===
The locking of the trunk may be achieved together with the passenger compartment.

Some cars include a function to remotely open the trunk. This may be achieved through a variety of means:

- release of the latch whereby the door seals push the decklid away from the lock, the trunk is then open, and the lid may not have revealed the opening.
- release of the latch whereby a spring pushes the decklid away from the lock and open, the trunk is then open, and the lid reveals the opening.
- release of the latch and actuation of a drive, whether hydraulic (BMW 7 Series) or electric (BMW X6), which pushes the decklid away from the lock; the trunk is then open, and the lid reveals the opening. This may then be electrically closed again.

== Etymology ==
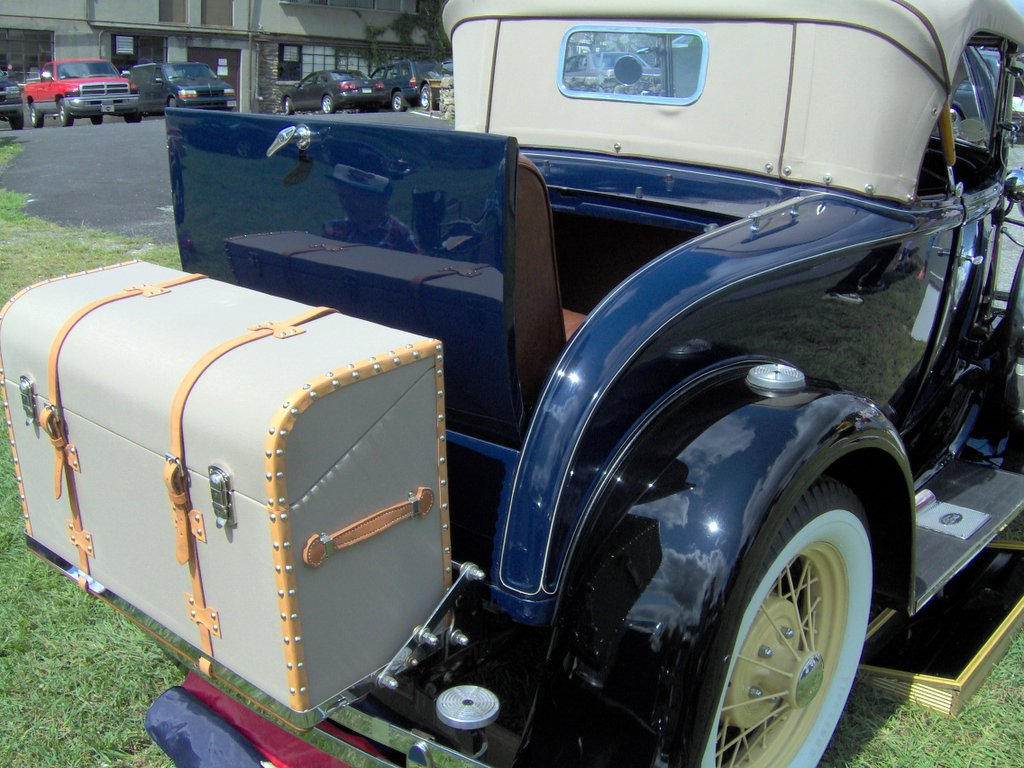
Early automobiles had provision for mounting an external trunk, the precursor to the modern enclosed storage space. Also pictured is an open rumble seat.

The usage of the word "trunk" comes from it being the word for a large travelling chest, as such trunks were often attached to the back of the vehicle before the development of integrated storage compartments in the 1930s; while the usage of the word "boot" comes from the word for a built-in compartment on a horse-drawn coach (originally used as a seat for the coachman and later for storage). The usage of the word "dickie" comes from the British word for a rumble seat, as such seats were often used for luggage before cars had integrated storage.

In France, from 1900 onwards, the luggage maker Moynat became a market leader in automobile luggage, for which the company developed a number of patented products including the rear-attached limousine trunk with custom-fitted suitcases. In 1928 came the side or lateral sliding trunk, a mechanism that foreshadowed the development of integrated trunks in vehicles from the 1930s onwards.

== Classification ==
=== Open or closed compartments ===
Open compartments are those found in station wagons and SUVs, while closed compartments have a trunk lid and are typically found in saloon (sedan) or coupé bodies. Closed compartments are separated from the passenger compartment by rigid body elements or seats, and are generally trimmed in simple materials, whereas many station wagons are trimmed with better-looking materials as the space is an extension of the passenger compartment. In order to hide the compartment content of station wagons or hatchbacks from thieves or sunlight, a cover may be fitted. On hatchbacks this often has the form of a rigid parcel shelf or a flexible sheet with hooks on the corners, while station wagons and many SUVs have a roller blind in a removable cassette.

=== Increased variability ===
To give the space more flexibility, many cars have foldable rear seats, which can increase the size of the trunk when needed.

== Safety ==
=== Avoiding accidents by luggage retention ===
The trunk space and its content can contribute to the safety of the vehicle. In vehicles that are partially loaded, the use of lashing eyes to restrain luggage can prevent or reduce damage to the vehicle and its occupants in severe maneuvers. In driving while cornering 'in-extremis', the prevention of sudden weight transfer due to poorly loaded luggage can be enough to prevent the vehicle from losing grip, and potentially avoiding thereby an accident.

=== Safety by luggage retention during a crash ===
If a crash should occur, lashing eyes can reduce the severity of the outcome of the accident by keeping the luggage in the loadspace compartment and thereby preventing projectiles from harming correctly restrained passengers in the passenger compartment. These lashing features may be in the form of fixed or foldable loops, or in the case of certain European vehicles combine sliding loops in a rail system to allow optimal positioning of the lashing eyes. At the same time, this eases the integration of accessories for loadspace management; dividers, bike carriers, etc. into the interior of the vehicle, a principle that has been applied in cargo vans and air transport for many years.

=== Barrier nets/grids ===
In vehicles with open luggage compartments, some are fitted with metal grids or guards to retain loose items in case of collision, or to simply create a bulkhead between the load in the trunk – for example, animals – separated from the otherwise unprotected passenger space.

Another solution for items that have not been restrained is the loadspace barrier net. These may be directly attached to the body structure or, in vehicles with loadspace cover cassettes, as a combined loadspace cover and barrier net. The net confines luggage to the loadspace in case of emergency braking and minor traffic collisions. These nets have the advantage over metal guards in that they can be rolled-up when not in use, taking up much less space than a comparable guard. A guard may however be tailored for an even tighter fit to the body interior contours than a roll-away net.

=== Inside trunk release ===
Children – and sometimes adults who climb inside to work on the vehicle – who become trapped in trunks can die of suffocation or heat stroke. Once in the trunk, they may not be able to get out, even if they entered through the interior, because many rear seats release to the trunk only from inside the passenger area. Beginning with the 2002 models, a glow-in-the-dark inside trunk release is required on all vehicles with conventional trunks sold in the United States. Hatchbacks, wagons, vans, and SUVs are exempt from this requirement because it is assumed a trapped person can kick out any cargo cover or parcel shelf to gain access to the main interior and passenger doors.

== Additional functions ==
Beyond carrying luggage, the trunk of most passenger vehicles commonly contains various other components often behind the trimmed surfaces of the interior. These components may be accessed by the customer or the service personnel through (in some cases lockable) hatches in the trim, or by removing carpet and support boards etc. Typical components:

- Emergency supplies
- Spare tire
- Jack and lug wrench
- On-board tool kit for do-it-yourself repairs
- Electronics for sound, video, satellite navigation, etc.
- Battery and hybrid energy store (see plug-in hybrids).
- Fuse boxes
- CNG/LPG tanks (for bivalent engines)
- Additional folding, or 'third-row', seating (increasingly in open loadspaces)

Some vehicles offer configurable cargo conveniences such as a shelf or board. They often serve various purposes. In addition to its 65/35 split fold-down and removable rear seat, the multiposition rear shelf on the Chrysler PT Cruiser can be used as a table for a picnic, a second cargo layer, or a security screen. The Citroën C3 has a foldable segmented false floorboard that compartmentalizes the cargo area, makes loading easier, and evens out the load floor when the back of the rear seat is folded down.

== See also ==
- Car boot liner
- Car boot sale
- Continental tire kit
- Hatchback
- List of auto parts
- Trunk (motorcycle)
