= Mat =

Protective or cushioning floor covering

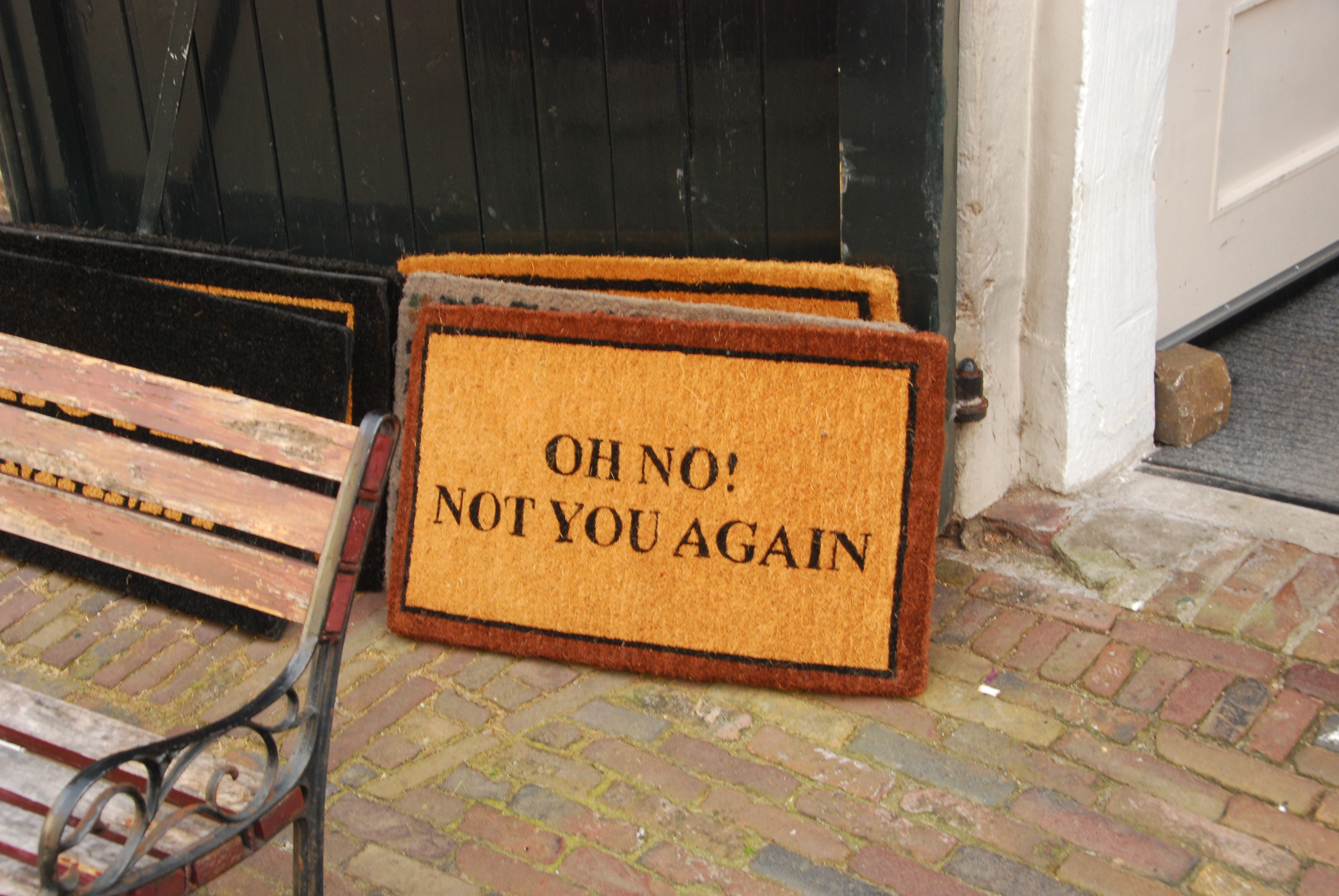
A doormat inscribed with a message

A mat is a hard or soft covering that generally is placed on a floor or other flat surface. Mats serve a range of purposes including:

- serving to clean items passed over it, such as a doormat, which removes dirt from the soles of shoes
- protecting that which is above the mat, such as a wrestling or gymnastics mat, or an anti-vibration mat
- protecting that which is beneath the mat, such as a place mat

== Types ==
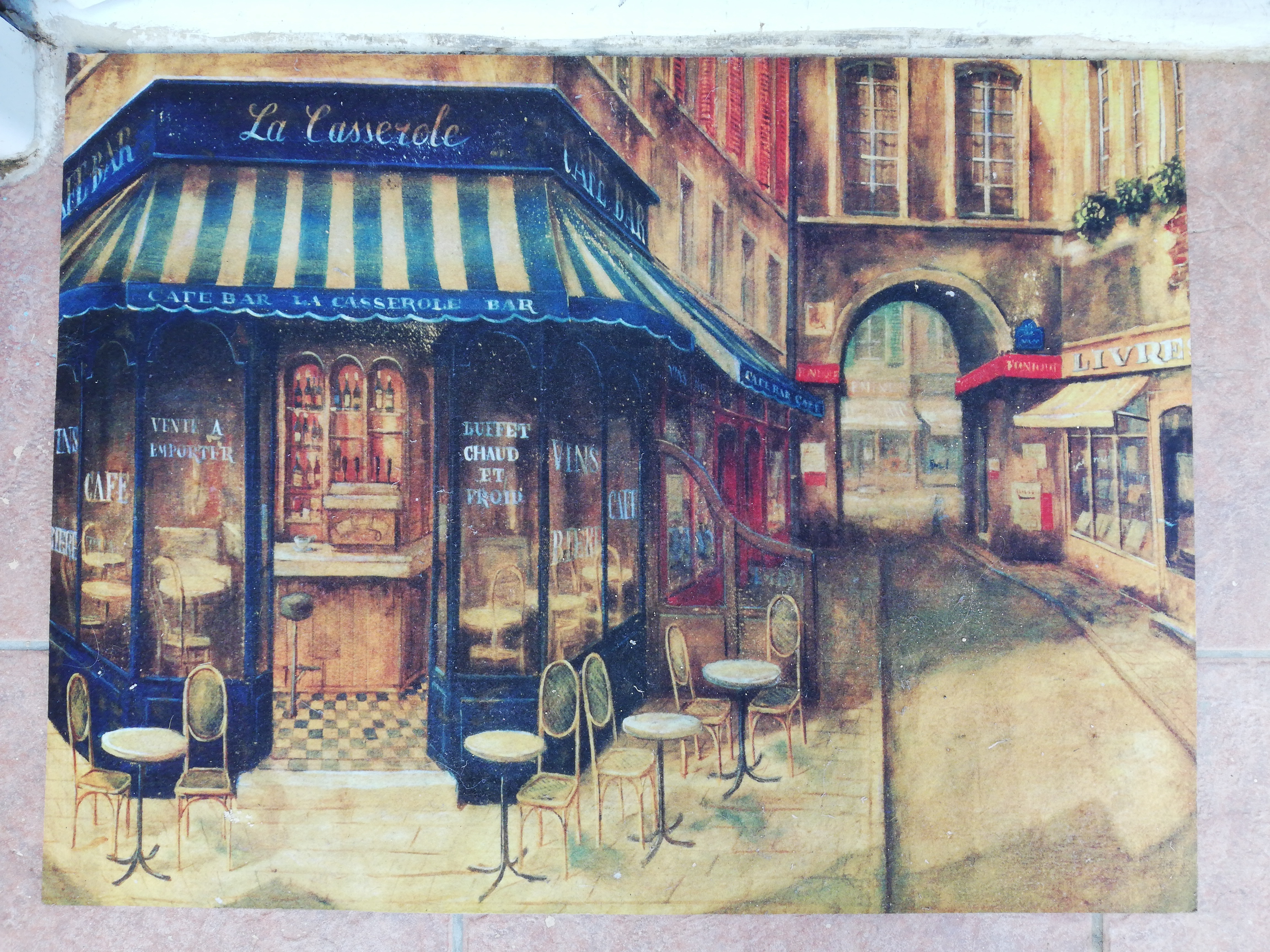
Flat mat with a illustration of a Paris street

=== In domestic settings ===
- In homes or rooms where people sit predominantly on the floor (common in Japan, Korea, India, and formerly China), mats may cover entire rooms, or be used in certain areas for sitting, sleeping or praying. The traditional Japanese style of mat is known as the tatami. Shoes are typically removed before entering these areas to keep out dirt and debris.
- A doormat or door-mat is a flat, usually rectangular but sometimes oval, object, usually placed immediately outside or inside the entrance to a house or other building, to allow people to easily scrub or wipe the soles of their shoes before entering. Doormats are usually made from tough, long-lasting material such as coir, palmyra (palm) fibres and stalks, nylon, rubber, cloth, or aluminium and other metals. A doormat may also be known as a welcome mat, as its location at an entrance constitutes a "welcome" to visitors, and may therefore also bear some word, message or sign of greeting.
- A cabinet mat is a mat made of rubber that protects kitchen cabinets, more particularly kitchen sink base cabinets, from leaks, water damage, mold and household item spills that commonly occur in the kitchen sink cabinet.
- A bath mat is used on the floor of a bathroom to provide a warm non-slip surface, and to absorb small amounts of water, much like a towel.
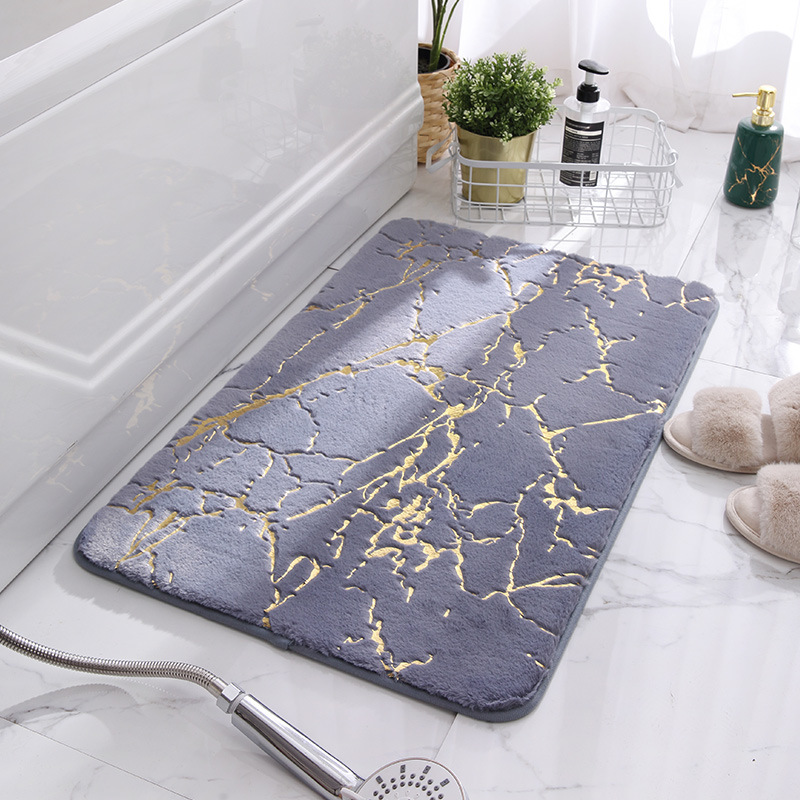
  Tapis de Bain design
- A place mat or serving mat is a flat piece of fabric or other type of material used on a table. They go under dishes and plates during meals. One purpose of such mats is to provide a thermal and physical barrier between the item placed on it and the table beneath.

=== Car mats ===
A car mat is designed to help protect a vehicle's carpeted floors. One major use of a car mat is to keep mud, sand and snow from contacting the carpeted floors. Some require fixation points to ensure they remain fixed in position.

Carpet mats and rubber mats differ in a number of ways. Carpet mats are generally tufted and have a rubberised anti-slip backing. On the other hand, rubber car mats are heavy duty and higher durability. While some car mats are the plain colour of rubber, many contain branded company logos, cartoon characters or advertisements. Some are in textile form of carpet material. They can also come in a wide range of colours. The terms universal and custom fit mats differentiate between floor mats that will fit a multitude of different cars and those that are specifically designed to fit only one chassis.

=== Anti-fatigue mats ===
"Anti-fatigue mats" are designed to help a person who is working in a standing position for prolonged periods of time. Most anti-fatigue matting is a combination of an ergonomic pattern and a cushioning underlay. The cushioning causes constant subconscious balance checks and micro movements that stimulate blood flow through the legs and lower extremities. This results in better circulation and less fatigue. The cushioning underlay insulates the feet from the hard surface, cold floors, vibrations, moisture and sound. Their unique design encourages the user to make continual micro-movements which provides a wealth of health benefits, such as minimizing back pain, foot pain, weariness, stress, etc. Anti-fatigue mats are one of the approaches to prevent injuries, caused by working in a standing position. In a study at the Center of Ergonomics at the University of Michigan in 1987, ergonomist Mark Redfern concluded that different standing surfaces can have dramatic effects on physical fatigue. Workers who stood on anti-fatigue mats were able to reduce the level of fatigue and discomfort by as much as 50%. This type of mat is recommended by Occupational Safety and Health Administration. The range of common materials for manufacturing anti-fatigue mats includes vinyl, wood, PVC tubing, rubber, PVC closed cell foam, polypropylene, nitrile rubber. Anti-fatigue mats were initially used in factories and production lines where staff has to stand for the majority of their working shifts.

Anti-fatigue mats come in various types and materials for industrial or commercial applications for a variety of workplace conditions that exist as well as the variety of workplace designs from individual work benches, to large assembly lines or complex manufacturing work stations. Work place environments can vary from dry areas to wet or extremely oily areas. Plus specialized industries may need additional properties such as fire retardant matting for welding, static dissipative matting for electrostatic discharge (ESD) protection, anti-microbial for food industry applications.

Today, this type of ergonomic mat is commonly used during trade shows for floor covering, in hospitals and clinics during surgeries to cover the floor near surgical tables to minimize surgeons fatigue resulted from continuous standing. Also these mats are used in housekeeping, especially for kitchen floors to alleviate fatigue during cooking.

In addition to industrial and retail workplaces, anti-fatigue mats are also used in animal farms and veterinary facilities to reduce joint stress and improve standing comfort for both staff and livestock.

=== Cleanroom mats ===
The purpose of a clean room mat is to keep sterile the areas that require ultimate protection from dirt, bacteria and any contamination brought from outside. Clean room mats are tacky, sticky, non slip mats that possess multiple layers of clean film that effectively capture dirt and dust from foot traffic and wheels. Peel-off mats are made up of multiple sheets of polyethylene film coated with acrylic adhesive that traps particles. Each layer peels off to reveal a new clean surface. The adhesive backing prevents microbial growth and contamination. Mats used outside clean rooms and laboratories are designed to withhold foreign pollution elements. This goal is achieved by a sticky surface that serves as a barrier for debris, dirt and dust adhered to shoe soles. Clean room sticky mats can contain two defensive barriers: the first part is a carpet itself, while the second part is sticky surface mat. Another mat type to be used to protect rooms from pollution is sanitizing foot bath floor mats. The mat itself is a small bath that contains sanitizing liquid. The foot bath bottom is covered with pliable rubber scrapers for effective cleaning of footwear soles while the liquid disinfects them.

An alternative clean room mat is one made from polymeric material. Polymeric products are made from a blend of pure polymeric compounds and have a three- to five-year life cycle. When a polymeric surface becomes dirty, operators can clean it with a sponge and a mop with detergent and dry the surface with a sqee. This quick cleaning process can be incorporated into the facility's regular wet-clean cycle.

The mats differ by composition:

- One-piece mats are usually used on the permanent basis. One-piece mats can be handcrafted or factory-made. The standard shapes of one-piece mat are rectangular, square, round and elliptic. One-piece mats are produced in the huge variety of sizes and colors. Real and synthetic materials are used for one-piece mats production.
- Linear length mats are manufactured as rolls that can extend 20 meters up to 40 meters for long production lines, assembly lines and packing lines. Mats are manufactured in standard lengths or factory-made to custom sizes.
- Modular mats, also well known as interlocking tiles or interlocking floor mats, are manufactured using the “jigsaw puzzle” structure. Unlike one-piece mats, modular mats consist of numerous elements that are easily and seamlessly assembled. Compared to other types of mats, interlocking mats come in several sizes, depending on the number of pieces in one kit. Modular mats are a good solution for non-rectangular areas where standard shape mats are useless. Interlocking mats are commonly used on a one-time or temporary basis: fitness centres and sport competitions, trade shows and conferences. Modular mats require less place for storage and can be easily transported.

=== Electrical insulating matting ===
Electrical insulating matting is a type of electrical insulation used to provide an insulating surface between a person and the ground or other conductive surfaces. It is intended to reduce the risk of electric shock by increasing the electrical resistance between a person and ground. It is commonly installed in areas where electrical equipment is operated or maintained, including in front of switchboards, distribution boards and other electrical installations. Electrical insulating mats are manufactured from materials with high electrical resistance, typically rubber or elastomeric compounds.

Electrical insulating matting is manufactured and tested to standards such as IEC 61111 or ASTM D178, which specify requirements for insulating properties, physical performance and testing.

=== Rubber grass mats ===
Rubber grass mats are used commonly around play equipment on playgrounds, schools and domestic properties where there is a risk of falling. As one of the most common and simple methods of protecting against a critical fall from height, rubber grass mats are usually laid on a grass or soil surface and immediately offer protection against serious harm. Usually made from a virgin rubber material and featuring a design which is around 90% open cell, the mats allow for grass to grow within the structure, offering a green and free-draining solution to improve safety in play areas and playgrounds.

Also used commonly for temporary events, such as festivals or weddings, rubber grass mats can be used to create a removable path or standing area and help to protect the grass from erosion or churn. As the mats are usually simply pegged into the ground and cable-tied to each other, they can be installed quickly and can also be removed at speed with minimal to no impact on the turfed surface.

=== Cow mats / Livestock mats ===
Cow mats, also known as livestock mats or animal comfort mats, are heavy-duty rubber mats commonly used in dairy farms, cattle sheds, and stables to provide cushioning and enhance hygiene for livestock. These mats reduce joint stress, minimize slipping on wet floors, and improve overall animal comfort during standing and resting. They are usually made from vulcanized rubber or EVA materials and may include anti-skid textures or drainage grooves to maintain a dry, stable surface in agricultural environments.

=== Others ===
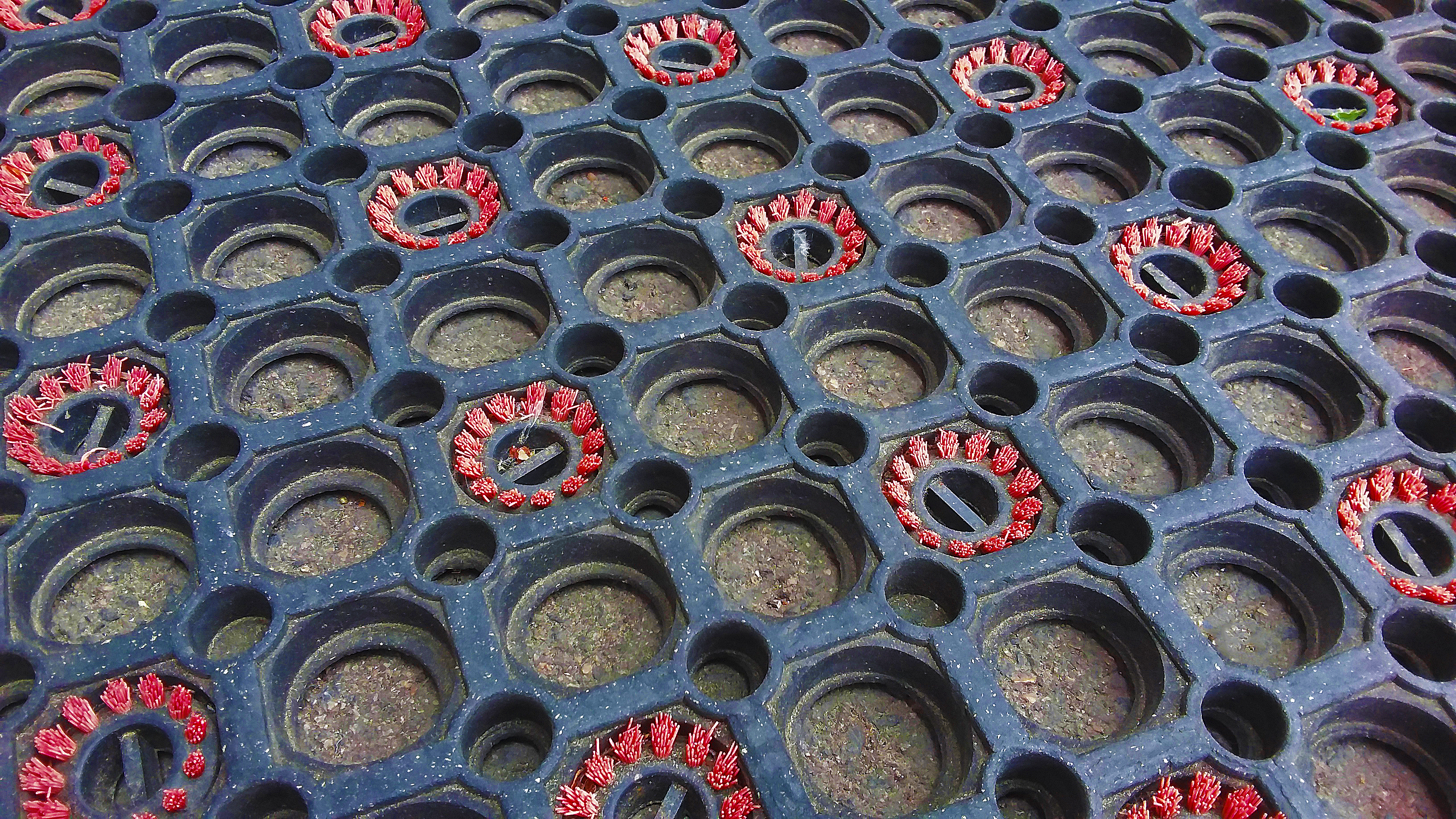
Plastic doormat (entrance mat) with freely insertable brush elements for the removal of coarse dirt

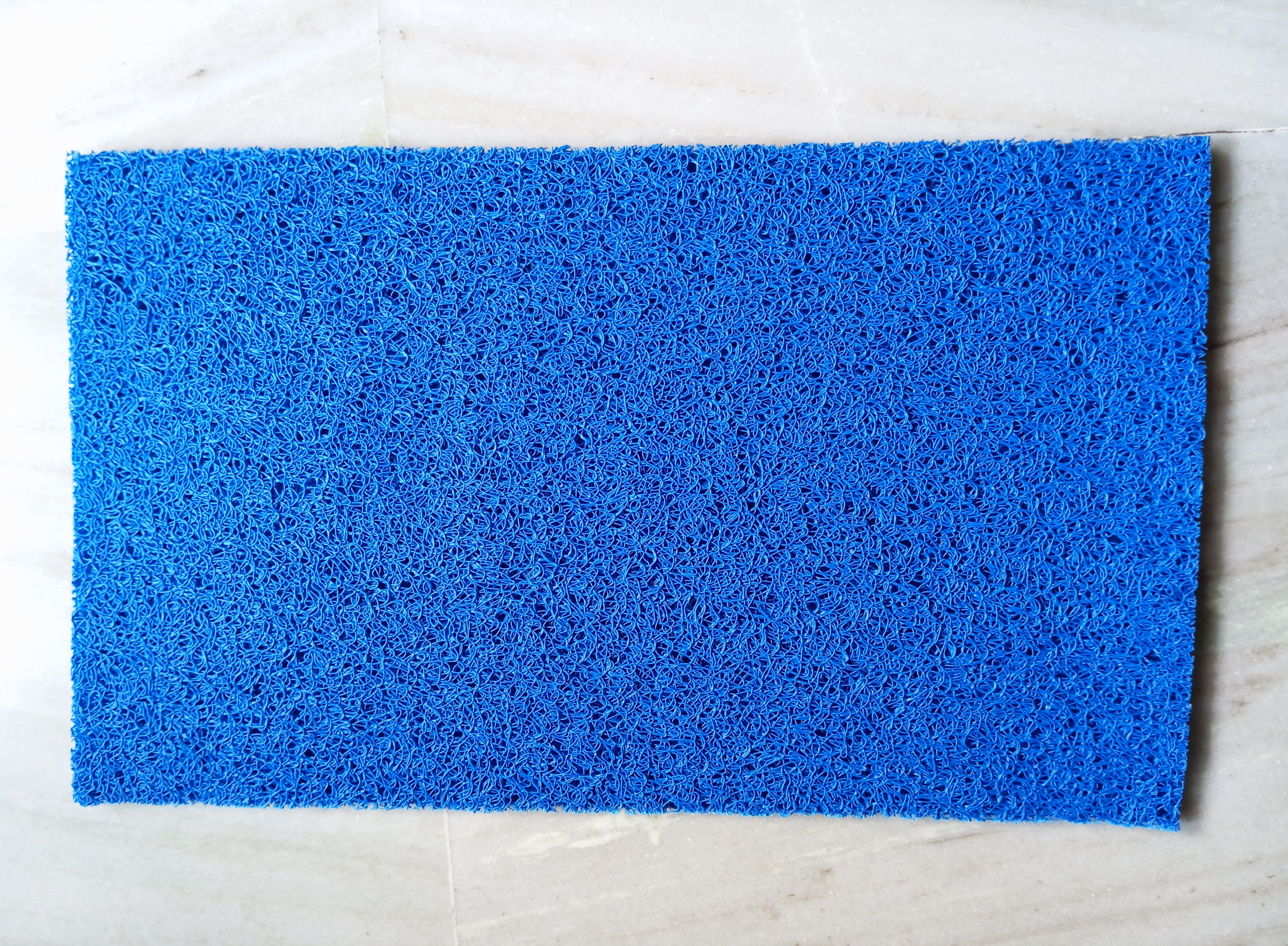
PVC doormat, Kolkata, West Bengal

- an anti-vibration mat, which performs the function of isolating vibration between that which is above the mat and that which is below. Such a mat might typically be used when mounting a heavy machine which vibrates, onto a concrete floor; in the absence of the anti-vibration mat, the machine tend to erode the floor through abrasion. Contrawise, some machines, such as the lithography machines used in chip fabs, need to be isolated from vibrations in their locale, and so are mounted on anti-vibration mats. These have also been used on train tracks.
- a slipmat, a circular piece of slippery cloth or synthetic material designed to allow disc jockeys to turn or stop vinyl records on record players, or to scratch.
- a bar mat (not beermat), a rectangular piece of rubber or towelling material that is used to protect the counter top and/or soak up spilt drinks in a bar or pub.

== Health and safety uses ==
A well-used door mat can trap and hold dirt and allergens, preventing their spread into the rest of the building, significantly improving IAQ and reducing the need for extensive cleaning. Additionally many floor mats are resistant to welding sparks and can keep employees from slipping on industrial lubricants or water.

Floor mats also provide safe surfaces on which to walk, preventing slips and falls that cause injury and liability damages. Anti-slip mats are now required in many areas to ensure maximum protection for both employees and customers. Specialized anti-slip mats are now available that provide extra resistance to the chemicals and grease that are sometimes found in industrial and food service settings.

Custom made anti-fatigue mats are also used in work areas where employees are required to stand for long periods of time. Employers have found that much muscle strain and injury endured by workers is caused by improper flooring conditions. Non-supportive surfaces cause fatigue and foot, back and neck pain due to impaired circulation. Anti-fatigue mats were shown to improve worker productivity by reducing the number of sick-days and injuries sustained by workers whose mobility would otherwise be restricted.

== See also ==
- Algal mat, a type of microbial mat formed on the water surface or on the surface of rocks
- Egbere, a mat-carrying creature in Yoruba mythology
- Marston Mat, used primarily for the rapid construction of temporary runways and landing strips
- Mat (picture framing)
- Prayer rug
- Roll mat or sleeping pad
- Tatami
- Woven mat (disambiguation)
- Yoga mat
